= Norwich Market =

Outdoor market in central Norwich, England

Coordinates: 52.6285°N 1.2929°E

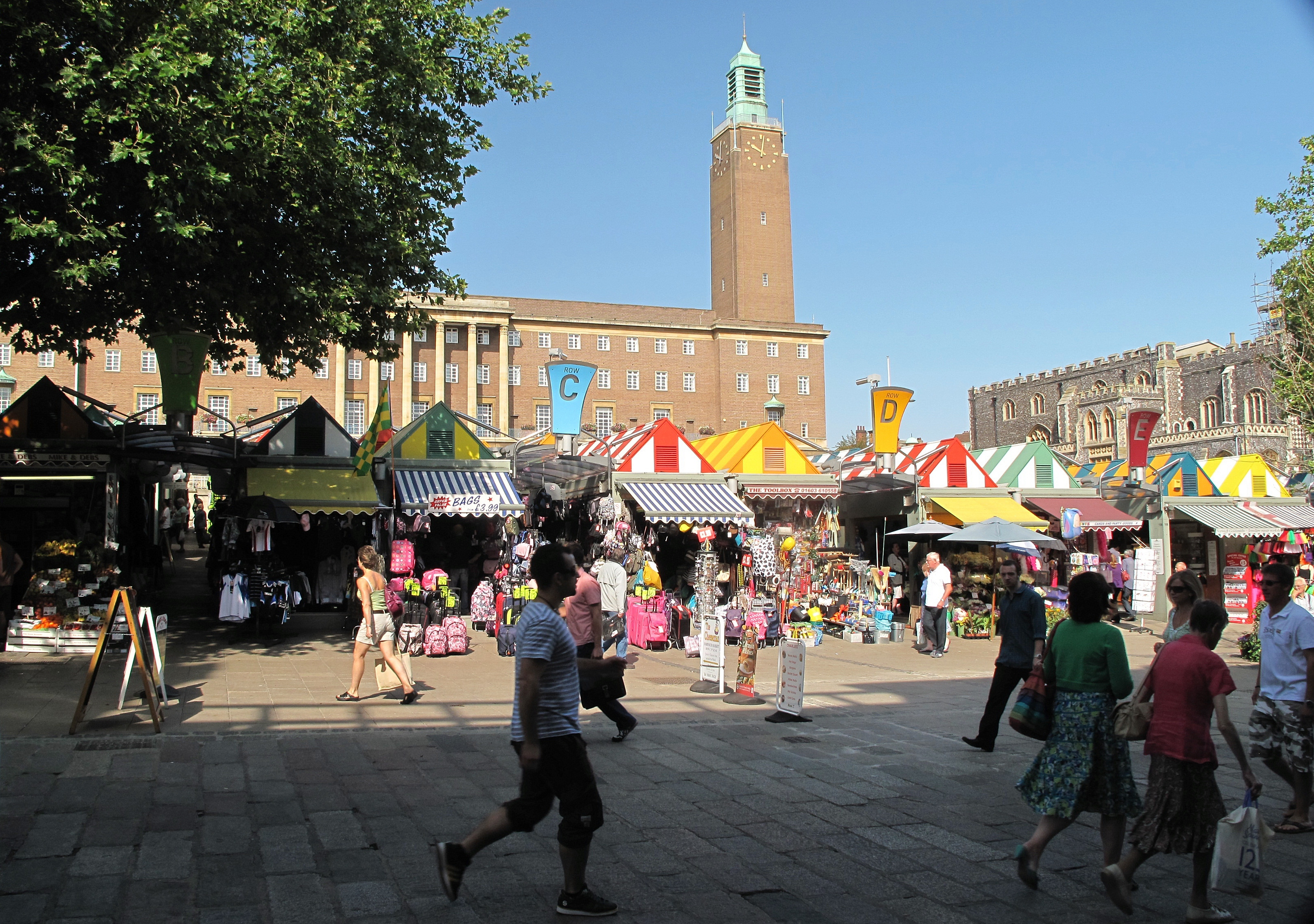
Norwich Market, 2009. The paved area in front of the market, now known as Gentleman's Walk, was formerly reserved for smallholders selling from temporary stalls. Since 1938 the market square has been dominated by the Art Deco City Hall (centre) and the 15th-century Guildhall (right).

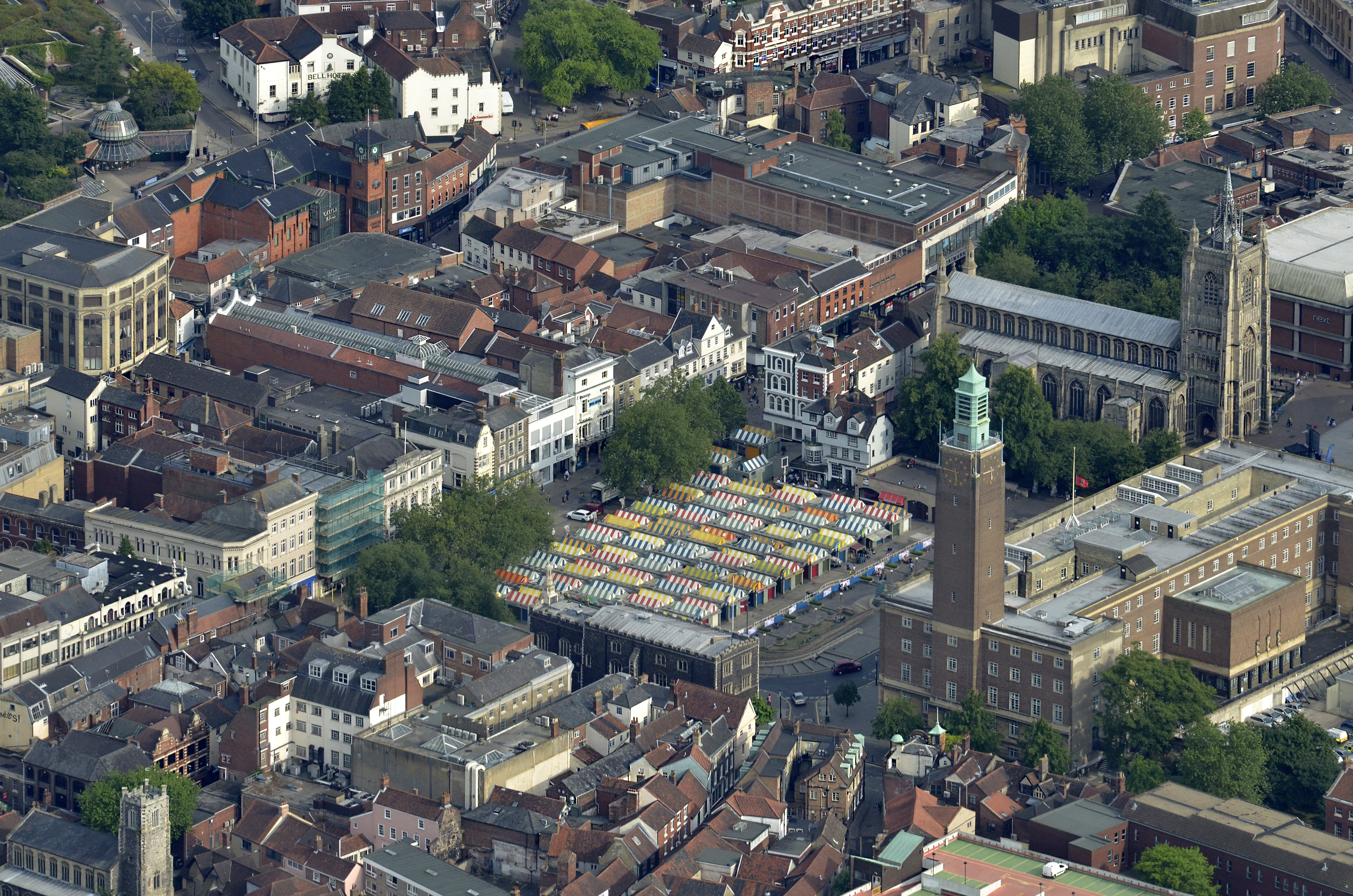
Norwich market from the air

Norwich Market (also known as Norwich Provision Market) is an outdoor market consisting of around 200 stalls in central Norwich, England. Founded in the latter part of the 11th century to supply Norman merchants and settlers moving to the area following the Norman conquest of England, it replaced an earlier market a short distance away. It has been in operation on the present site for over 900 years.

By the 14th century, Norwich was one of the largest and most prosperous cities in England, and Norwich Market was a major trading hub. Control of, and income from, the market was ceded by the monarchy to the city of Norwich in 1341, from which time it provided a significant source of income for the local council. Freed from royal control, the market was reorganised to benefit the city as much as possible. Norwich and the surrounding region were devastated by plague and famine in the latter half of the 14th century, with the population falling by over 50%. Following the plague years, Norwich came under the control of local merchants and the economy was rebuilt. In the early 15th century, a Guildhall was built next to the market to serve as a centre for local government and law enforcement. The largest surviving mediaeval civic building in Britain outside London, it remained the seat of local government until 1938 and in use as a law court until 1985.

In the Georgian era, Norwich became an increasingly popular destination with travellers and developed into a fashionable shopping town. Buildings around the market were developed into luxury shops and coaching inns. The eastern side of the market was particularly fashionable and became known as Gentleman's Walk. The area around the market had become very congested by the 19th century, but the council was unable to raise funds for improvement and few alterations were made. Because many of the market's stalls were privately owned, the council was unable to rearrange the market into a more rational layout.

Following the First World War, the local authority began to systematically buy up all the stalls on the market, eventually bringing the entire market into public ownership. It was radically redesigned in the 1930s: stalls were arranged into parallel rows and a new City Hall was built along the entire western side of the marketplace to replace the by then inadequate Guildhall. This new arrangement survived with few significant changes for the rest of the 20th century. By the 1990s, the market was becoming decrepit and, in 2003, proposals were made for another radical rebuilding of the area. These proposals were extremely controversial and were abandoned in 2004 in favour of a scheme which retained the parallel rows of stalls, but replaced the old stalls with steel units of four stalls each. The rebuilt market was completed in early 2006 and is one of the largest markets in Britain.

== Foundation ==
The county town of Norfolk, Norwich is a city on the River Wensum in the East of England. Its origins are unclear, but by the reign of King Æthelstan (924–939) the city was a major trading centre and one of the most important boroughs in England. The Anglo-Saxon settlement was centred around Tombland, a large open space at the point where the roads into Norwich converged. The plain of Tombland was the site of Norwich's market.

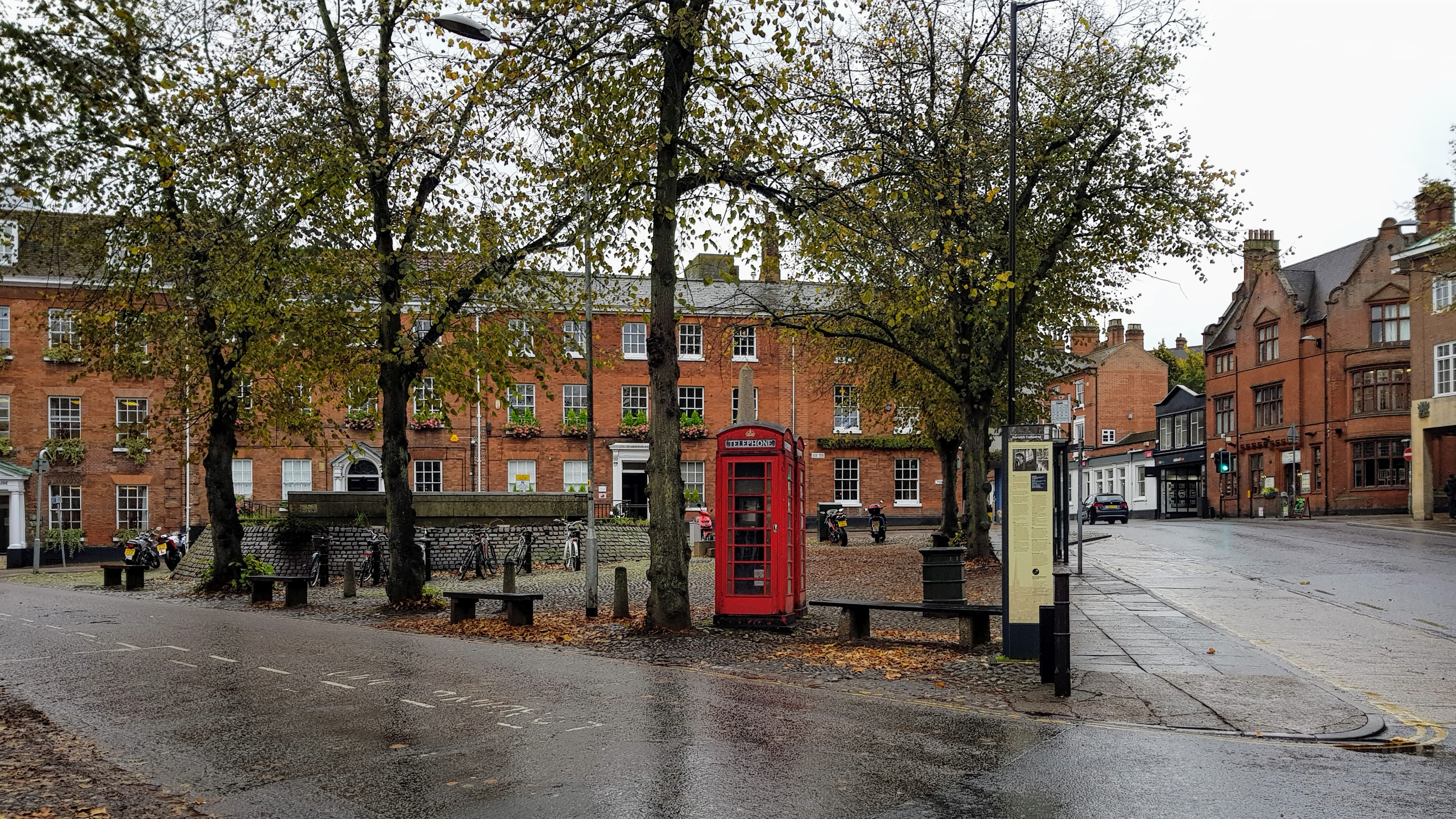
Tombland, site of Norwich's market until the 11th century, remains an open space

Following the Norman Conquest of England (1066–1071), Norwich was radically redesigned. Norwich Cathedral was built immediately to the east of Tombland and much of the old town to the southwest of Tombland was cleared for the motte of Norwich Castle. A new Norman town was built west of the Castle, in an area known as Mancroft. (Note: From Latin: Magna Crofta, "large field".) The new town at Mancroft included a market of its own to provide for the Norman settlers and merchants moving into the area, and possibly also to supply the castle's garrison. The exact date of the foundation of the market at Mancroft is not recorded, but it is known to have been operational by the time the Domesday Book was compiled in 1086. Granting the right to trade in Norman England was a part of the Royal Prerogative and, as with most fairs and markets of the period, the market at Mancroft was operated under licence from the King. The King's Clerk had jurisdiction over all trade conducted at the market, and tolls and rents were collected on behalf of the King.

Almost no records survive of the Norman market in the 11th to 13th centuries. It is known that shortly after the market's establishment, a tollhouse was built nearby, which served as a collection point for taxes on trade. Although the precise location of the tollhouse is not recorded, it was immediately north of the market on part of the site now occupied by the Guildhall. At some point soon after its construction, the tollhouse also became the centre for the civil administration of the city. Although the Tombland market retained its charter to host an annual horse fair, over time the market at Mancroft supplanted that at Tombland as the principal market of the area. At the end of the 11th century, the Tombland market was removed during construction work on Norwich Cathedral.

== Norwich Market in the Middle Ages ==
By the start of the 14th century, Norwich was one of Europe's major cities. East Anglia was at this time one of the most densely populated areas in England, producing large amounts of grain, sheep, cattle and poultry. Much of this produce was traded in Norwich, an inland port roughly at the centre of the region. The City, meanwhile, had industrialised, its growth based on textiles, leather and metalworking, as well as being the administrative centre of the region. By 1300, Norwich had a population of between 6,000–10,000, with a total of around 20,000 people living in the area. (One 19th-century historian estimated Norwich's population pre-1349 at as high as 70,000.) It was one of the largest and most prosperous cities in the country, and was considered the second city of England. Aside from occasional fairs, the majority of all goods produced in or imported to the region passed through the market at Mancroft. While there is some evidence that the market operated daily for a period around 1300, it generally operated on Wednesdays and Saturdays.

=== Layout ===
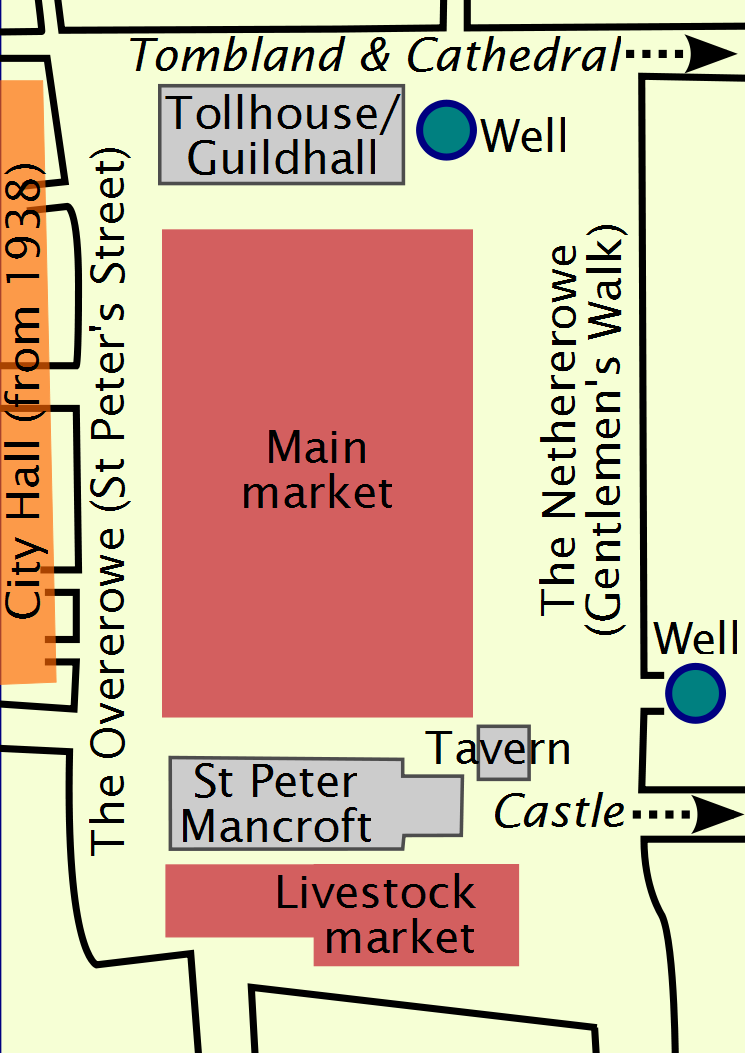
Other than the replacement of the tollhouse with the Guildhall in 1413, the 1938 building of City Hall and the closure of the livestock market and wells, the layout of Norwich Market and the surrounding streets has changed little since the early 14th century. (Note: Not to scale. The tavern northwest of St Peter Mancroft (called the Sir Garnet Wolseley from 1874) was also flanked by shoemakers' stalls (not marked) in the mediaeval period. The tollhouse was smaller than the Guildhall which replaced it and stood roughly halfway along the northern end of the marketplace. Prior to its replacement by the Guildhall, a vegetable market was located between the tollhouse and the Overerowe on the site now occupied by the western end of the Guildhall.)

The market had by this time taken on roughly the layout it retains today. It was a long rectangular open space aligned north–south, with the tollhouse (the Guildhall after 1413) marking the northern end and the very large church of St Peter Mancroft marking the southern end. (St Peter Mancroft was built in 1430–1455 incorporating an earlier church built in 1075 and was financed by the market's merchants. It retains its association with the market; all stallholders retain the right to hold their weddings in the church and to be buried in the churchyard.) The marketplace sloped downwards from west to east. A long straight passageway called the Nethererowe or Nether Row (later renamed Gentleman's Walk) marked the eastern boundary. Another passage called the Overerowe, or Over Row (later renamed St Peter's Street, and since 1938 occupied by City Hall), marked the western boundary.

The mediaeval market was divided into sections, each dealing with a particular trade. The stalls of the market were arranged in rows. They varied in width from 2 feet (60 cm) to 15 feet (460 cm). Highly valuable, in the early years of the market they were generally owned by major institutions such as trade guilds and religious bodies, and generated a high income from rents. They also provided a steady income for the King, and later the city, from perpetual rents. The marketplace was surrounded by retail buildings, construction of which began in about 1300. These were fixed, permanent structures, some of which had multiple storeys and cellars.

The northern section of the main market place, immediately south of the tollhouse, housed fishmongers, butchers, ironmongers and woolsellers. This section of the market also housed the murage loft after 1294, where tolls to fund the building of Norwich's city walls were collected. The southern section of the main market place, north of St Peter Mancroft, housed a bread market and a number of stalls associated with Norwich's significant cloth and leather industries. A broad space between the main marketplace and the Nethererowe was kept clear for the use of country smallholders, who would set up temporary booths and tents to sell their wares.

South of St Peter Mancroft was a second marketplace dealing in wheat, poultry, cattle and sheep. Pigs, horses, timber and dye were not traded in the main market, but had dedicated markets elsewhere in the city. (The modern Norwich place names of Timberhill, St John Maddermarket and Rampant Horse Street derive from their origins as the sites of the mediaeval timber, dye and horse markets respectively.)

=== Transfer to city control ===
In 1341, King Edward III visited Norwich for a jousting tournament, coinciding with the completion of the city's defensive walls. Edward and his mother, Isabella of France, were very impressed by the city and, as a token of appreciation for bearing the costs of the defensive fortifications, Edward granted the franchise of the market to the city in perpetuity. The control by the King's Clerk over trade at the market was ended and tolls and rents from the market from then on went directly to the city's bailiffs (the rulers of the city).

With the powers of the King's Clerk abolished, the bailiffs of Norwich set about regulating the operation of the market for what they felt was the greatest benefit to the city. To encourage fair competition among the market's traders, it was forbidden to sell foodstuffs before the Cathedral bell had tolled for Lady Mass (6.00 am). The practice of forestalling (meeting merchants on their way to the market either to buy their goods for resale, or to prevent them from attending the market and thus make goods of the type they were selling scarce and hence more expensive) was forbidden. Trading anywhere other than in the market was strongly discouraged and the right to re-sell goods at a profit was restricted to Freemen of the city. (Note: Freemen of the city paid increased taxes. As a consequence, they were permitted to engage in some business practices forbidden to the general public, as it was felt that increasing their income benefited the city as a whole.) The prices of bread and beer were fixed, (Note: The Assize of Bread and Ale, which regulated the prices of bread and beer, was frequently disregarded in Norwich. Bakers and brewers breaching the Assize were regularly fined or sentenced to the stocks.) and a set of standardised weights and measures was introduced, against which measures used by merchants would regularly be checked. Shortly after the transfer of the market to the city a market cross was erected near the centre of the main market (opposite the present day entrance to Davey Place), the design of which is not recorded.

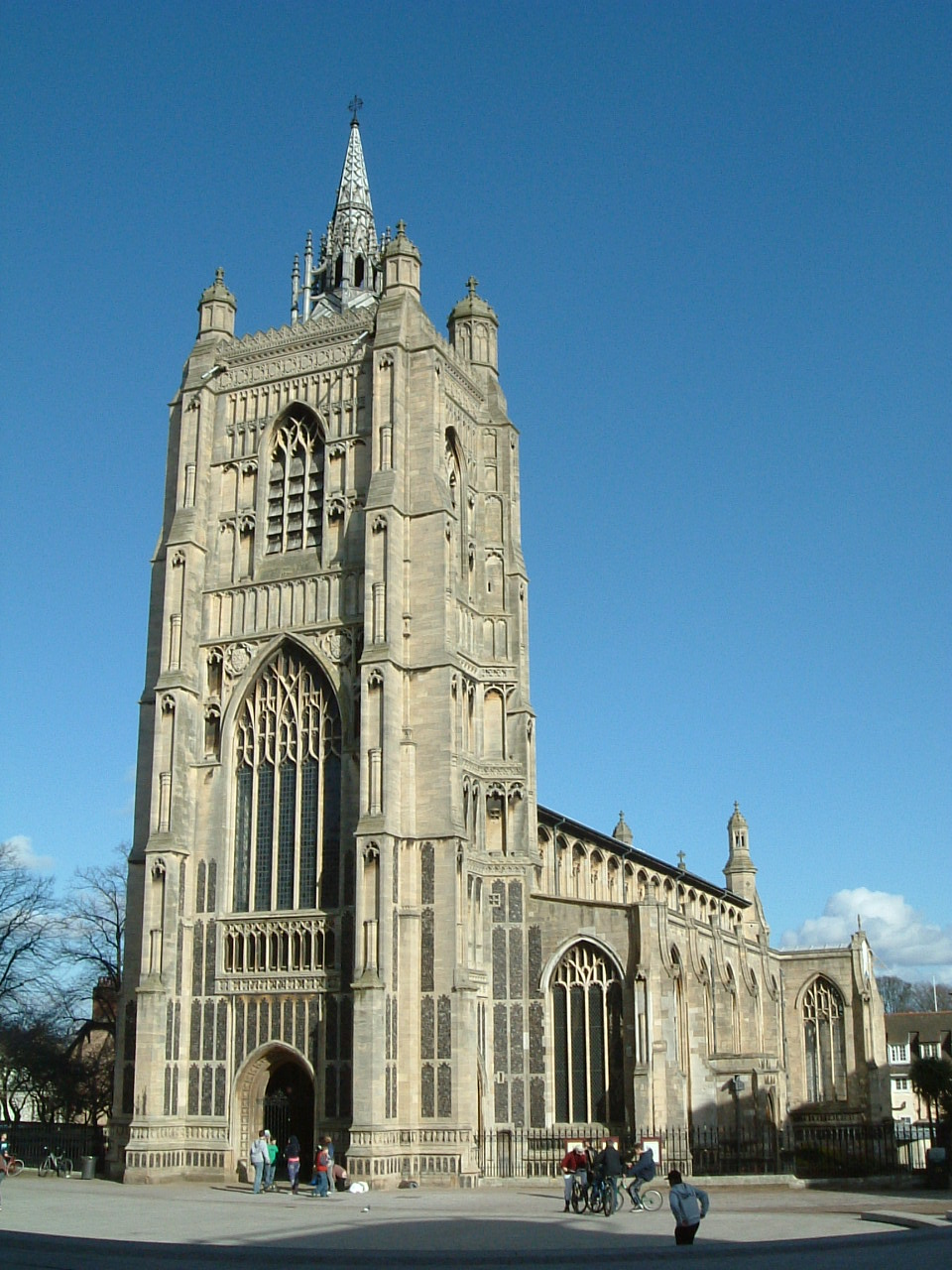
St Peter Mancroft

In mid-1348, the outbreak of bubonic plague known as the Great Mortality (later referred to as the Black Death), which had swept across Europe during the past year, reached England for the first time with an outbreak in the south coast port of Melcombe. The plague spread gradually over the rest of the country with devastating effect, causing a mortality estimated at between 30%–45%. In late March 1349, the outbreak reached East Anglia and, for reasons which are not understood, increased drastically in intensity. In 1349–50 alone, more than half the population of East Anglia died.

In 1369, East Anglia, whose farming economy had collapsed in the wake of the plague, was struck by famine. Although the market continued to operate, in the immediate aftermath of the plague it was at a much reduced level and many stalls were left empty for some years after. The famine of 1369 overwhelmed Norwich's burial grounds, necessitating an expansion of St Peter Mancroft's churchyard. The southernmost rows of stalls in the main marketplace, which had been occupied by drapers and linen merchants, were removed to clear space for an enlarged churchyard. By 1377, the population of Norwich had fallen from at least 20,000 before the outbreak to below 6,000.

From the summer of 1378 into 1380, the relatively speedy transfer of the stalls, selds and shops of the market from private ownership to that of the city is evidenced in 40 deeds, comprising 61 separate transactions. Seven more deeds were enacted in St Peter Mancroft from 1381 to 1391, accomplishing the mission of placing the vast majority of the market in the hands of city government within a decade. In 1392, the market square consisted of 3 messuages, 18 shops, and 42 stalls. That year, 52s of annual rent was owed to the King in burgage. Over 56% of all of the city's acquisitions recorded in the Norwich Domesday Book were in St Peter Mancroft. From this time onward, the municuipal government received revenue from renting out the shops and stalls of the market.

Although social order was maintained throughout the plague years, the economy of the region was devastated. (Note: The economy and infrastructure of Norfolk took centuries to recover from the plague and subsequent famine. Almost 400 years after the epidemic, a historian recorded that in 1349 "Norwich was in the most flourishing state she ever saw, and more populous than she hath been ever since".) However, the surviving merchant community were very influential in the city and, in the wake of the catastrophe, set about increasing the council's influence around the market, buying many of the surrounding shops. The council also bought a set of wharves along King Street near Dragon Hall in 1397 and decreed that all goods entering Norwich by water be unloaded there. This ensured almost complete control of Norwich trade by the merchants who now dominated the council.

The market soon began to recover from the plague years to become a major trading hub again. Records of 1565 show 37 butchers' stalls alone in the market, and Norwich also became a major centre for the import of exotic foods. Sugar, figs and prunes were traded in the market in the 16th century, and it is recorded that 20,000 oranges and 1,000 lemons were provided for the 1581 St Bartholomew's Day fair.

=== Guildhall and new market cross ===
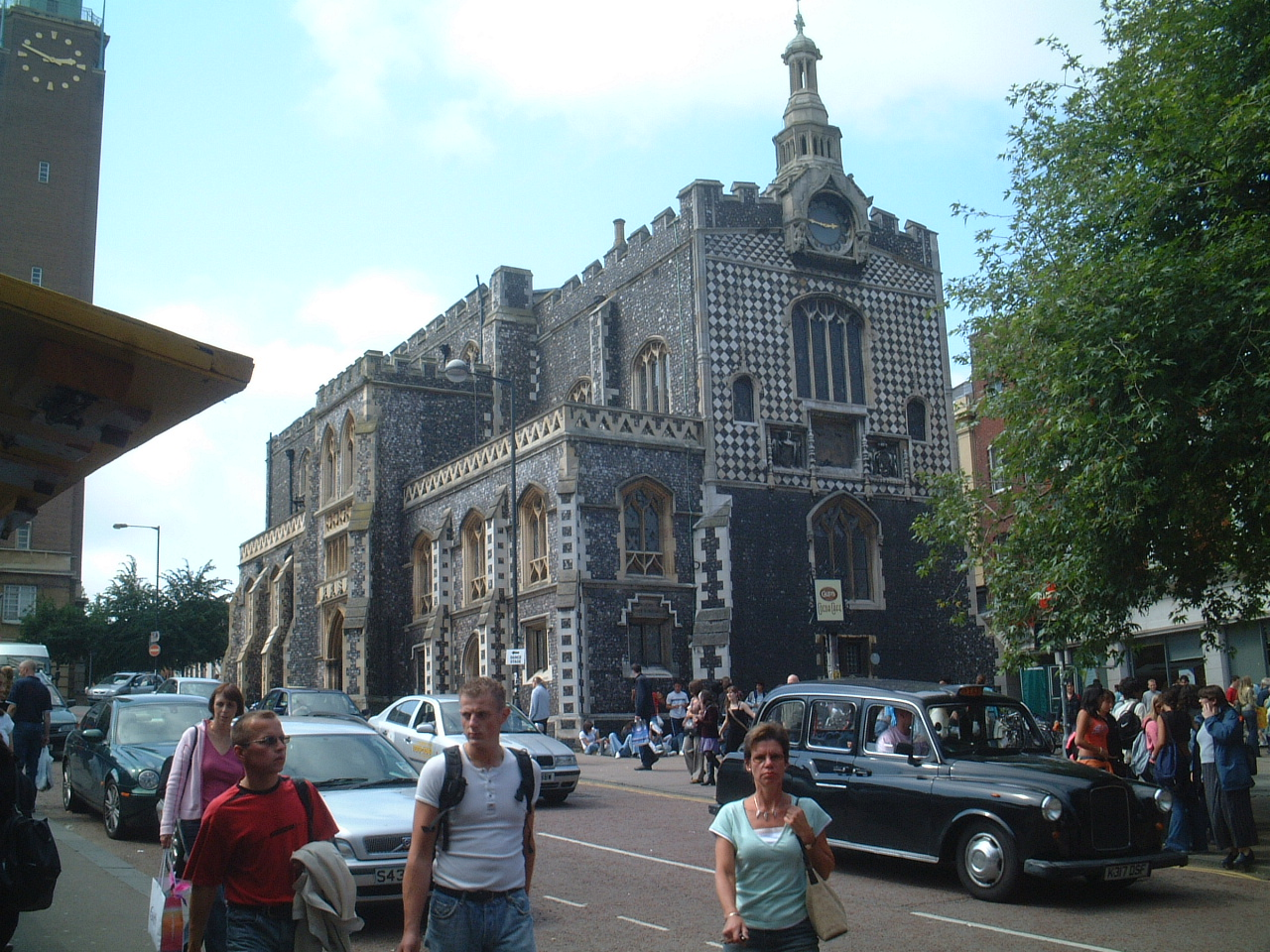
Norwich Guildhall

In 1404, Norwich secured a royal charter granting it autonomy as "The County of the City of Norwich". The local council was restructured into a body headed by a Mayor and administered by Sheriffs and Aldermen; the Mayor also formally became Clerk of the Markets, but in practice the running of the markets was always delegated to deputies.

By this time, the tollhouse was proving inadequate as the seat of local government and between 1407 and 1413 it was demolished, along with an adjoining site which had housed a vegetable market, and was replaced by a new Guildhall. In keeping with Norwich's status, it was one of the largest civic buildings in England outside London and housed all aspects of local government and justice for the new council. (Note: Norwich's Guildhall is the largest surviving mediaeval civic building—i.e., other than religious buildings and military fortifications—in the United Kingdom outside London.) The Guildhall cost between £400–£500 to build. (As it was built primarily using pressed labour, modern equivalents of the building costs are virtually meaningless. The annual income of the city council at the time the Guildhall was built was around £120.) The eastern face of the Guildhall was built in a distinctive black and white checked design, representing the exchequer. The undercroft of the tollhouse was retained for use as a dungeon, while a new basement served as a lock-up from the opening of the Guildhall until the 1980s.

The murage loft in the market, redundant since the completion of the city walls, took over the functions of the old tollhouse and became the offices of the market supervisor and the collection office for market tolls and taxes.

Between 1501 and 1503, Mayor John Rightwise had the original market cross demolished and replaced with an elaborate new cross. This was octagonal in shape, stood on a plinth 30 feet (9 m) wide, and rose to a height of 60 to 70 feet (18 to 21 m). The central structure contained an oratory, occupied by a priest.

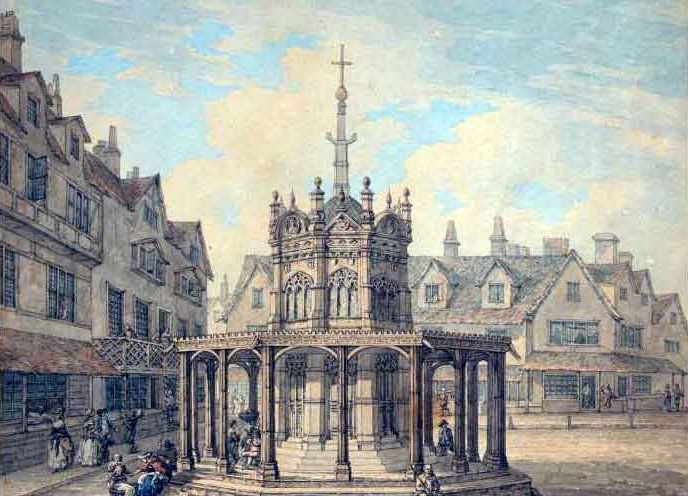
Norwich Market Cross, by Thomas Hearne

Rightwise's new market cross only survived in its original form for a short time. During the English Reformation of the 1530s, the rood on the pinnacle was pulled down and the oratory became a storeroom. The octagonal plinth became a shopping arcade of small stalls. In 1549, a temporary gallows was erected at the cross for the mass execution of 60 of the participants in Kett's Rebellion, who had congregated in the marketplace during their brief capture of Norwich. In 1574, a local law was enacted demanding that all unemployed men were to assemble at the market cross each morning at 5.00 am, along with the tools of their trade, and remain there for an hour in the hope that they would be offered work; a bonesetter was hired to treat any men who claimed they were unfit for work through injury. The success of this scheme is not recorded.

By the 17th century, the building was known as the Market House, and was used for the sale of grain and other goods sold by the bushel; a set of approved measures were chained to the pillars for public use. The archaic title of "Keeper of the Cross" was bestowed on the man appointed to sweep the marketplace weekly. (Note: The Keeper of the Cross was obliged to sweep the market weekly, with the threat of dismissal should any muck or refuse from the Saturday market still be in place on Tuesday. He was also responsible for the bi-weekly sweeping of Norwich's four bridges and of waste grounds in the city. With horses heavily used by traders and shoppers to transport goods to and from the market, the build-up of horse manure was a problem faced by the market until the 20th century.)

The market cross also served as the focal point of Norfolk's parliamentary elections. Candidates would bring large crowds of voters in by cart from the surrounding countryside and ply them with large quantities of free alcohol to ensure their support. Candidates would pay for lodgings for the voters, but, in closely fought elections, more voters than usual would be shipped in and every inn in the city would fill, forcing voters to sleep in and around the cross. Sir Thomas Browne described the voters around the market cross as "like flocks of sheep" during the unusually close elections of 1678, at the height of the Exclusion Crisis. Following the counting of the vote, the winning candidate would be carried three times around the market, followed by torch-bearers and trumpeters. By this time, the crowds would generally be extremely drunk on the liquor provided by the candidates, and elections would often degenerate into drunken revelry or fighting.

Although it was popular with travelling vendors, particularly of small fancy goods, the maintenance of the market cross was costly and unpopular with Norwich's citizens. In 1732 the cross was demolished, and the stone was sold for £125. In 2005 the base of the cross was rediscovered in excavations during renovation of the market area, but has since been re-covered. Its site is now outlined in red stones embedded in the market floor.

== Other uses of the market square in Tudor and Stuart England ==
Here also remains the ruins of a very stately castle, built on the top of an eminent hill in the midst of the town, over-topping all the rest of the city, and to this castle, surrounded with deep dikes, there is an entrance by one bridge having only one great and entire arch under it, of such a vast breadth and height that it surpasses any of the bridges in Yorkshire, over the river Wharfe or elsewhere. A little way from this castle on the opposite side of a hill, is the chief market place of this city, and this being the only place where all things are brought to be sold, for the food of this great city, they not as in London allowing markets in several places, make it vastly full of provisions, especially on Saturdays, where I saw the greatest shambles for butchers' meat I had ever yet seen, and the like also for poultry and dairy-meats, which dairy people also bring many quarters of veal with their butter and cheese, and I believe also in their seasons pork and hog-meats. These people fill a square of ground on the side of a hill twice as big as Abingdon market place. They setting their goods in ranges as near as may be one above another, only allowing room for single persons to pass between; and above these the butchers have their shambles and such kind of people as sell fish, of which there was plenty of such kinds as the seas hereabouts afford, viz. crabs, flounders, mackerel, very cheap, but lobster for sea fish and pike or jack for river fish, were dear enough. ... Their chief market house stands in the midst of this great market place, now very full of people and provisions, being circular or round in form, having chained to the several pillars thereof bushels, pecks, scales, and other things for the measuring and weighing of such goods as are brought to the market.

— Thomas Baskerville, 1681

With few fixed structures in the main marketplace, the plain traditionally served as a public open space on days when the market was not operational. Before the Reformation in the 1530s, its main use was as a venue for religious festivals, particularly the annual procession of the Craft Guilds at Corpus Christi. Most public religious festivals were abandoned following the Reformation and the subsequent dissolution of many of the mediaeval guilds, and the leading event on Norwich's civic calendar became the annual inauguration of the mayor, which took place each May. (Note: The great procession of Corpus Christi had taken place in late May or early June each year.)

The inauguration ceremony was conducted by the civic authorities and by the surviving, and still powerful, Guild of St George, and combined elements of a public festival and a religious carnival. Four whifflers (city officials carrying swords) marched ahead of the procession to clear a path. Behind the whifflers, the incoming and outgoing mayors rode side-by-side, preceded by trumpeters and standard-bearers carrying the banners of England and St George, and followed by the city's Sheriffs and Aldermen in ceremonial gowns of violet and red, respectively. The procession was flanked by the city's waits (musicians playing loud wind instruments, usually the shawm) (a mediaeval double reed wind instrument with conical wooden body), and accompanied by dick fools (clowns carrying wands and wearing red and yellow gowns adorned with bells and cats' tails) and a man costumed as a dragon.

As well as the mayoral inaugurations, the marketplace was also the setting for other public events, particularly mourning processions on the deaths of monarchs, coronation celebrations, (Note: A parade to celebrate the coronation of the nine-year-old King Edward VI in 1547 featured a giant effigy of King [[[Solomon]] to signify the supposed wisdom of the new king, and a mermaid whose symbolic significance is not recorded. Free beer was given to those attending the parade.) royal birthdays and celebrations of military victories. Firework displays and bonfires would be held on these occasions, accompanied by the local militia firing volleys and the ringing of the bells of the surrounding churches, while local residents and shopkeepers would illuminate their windows with lit candles. Often, particularly in the 18th century, temporary triumphal arches would be erected beside the Guildhall. Free beer would traditionally be distributed at these events, which would on occasion degenerate into drunken disorder.

The market was also the location for public punishment of wrongdoers, and stocks and a pillory were set at a prominent position at the eastern end of the Guildhall. The stocks were used for the punishment of relatively minor offences such as breaching the regulations on the price of bread, public brawling, or incivility to the Mayor; wrongdoers would on occasion also be paraded around the market wearing paper hats bearing details of their offence. The pillory was used for more serious offences such as sedition. On at least two occasions in the late 16th century people convicted of sedition were nailed to the pillory by their ears; on completion of their time on the pillory their ears were cut off. Public whippings of criminals were also conducted in the marketplace. Although not all executions in the period are recorded, it is known that public hangings also took place in the market square and around the market cross.

By the 17th century, the market had also become the venue for many travelling entertainments. Exotic animals were displayed, including lions, tigers, camels, and jackals, and displays by conjurers, puppeteers, singers, acrobats and other entertainers also regularly took place. Displays of human deformities were also popular; records exist from the 1670s and 1680s of the Mayor granting exhibition licences to, among others, "a monstrous man with 2 bodies brought from the Indies by Sir Thomas Grantham", "a girl of sixteen with no bones", "a monstrous hayrie child", and "a monstrous man taken from amongst the hills of Corinthia, he feeds on the roots of trees etc". Stages erected by charlatans selling medicines and demonstrating miracle cures were often erected near the Guildhall, prompting regular complaints from fishmongers that the crowds were blocking access to their stalls; on at least one occasion one of these travelling doctors had his licence withdrawn 'because of possible damage to the city's economy by the distraction of "idle minds" from their work'.

== Developments in the Georgian period ==
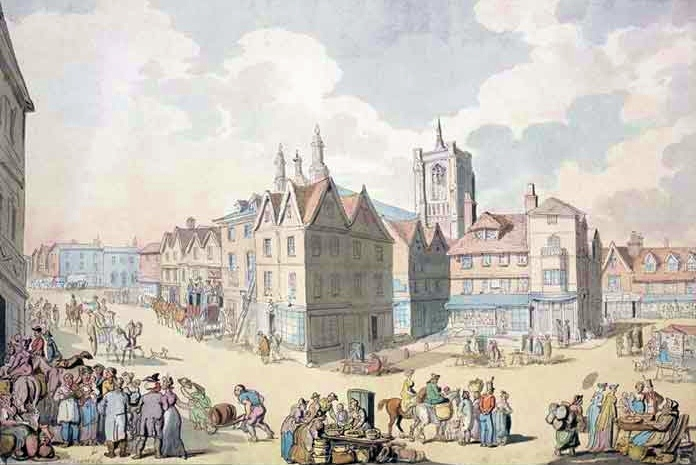
Norwich Market Place by Thomas Rowlandson, 1788. This shows the southern tip of the main market (centre), with Gentleman's Walk running south towards the former livestock market site to the left. The buildings to the right divided the upper and main markets; Pudding Lane, the alley between these buildings and the church, still exists.

Improvements in Norfolk's road infrastructure and the development of the stagecoach system made Norwich an increasingly popular destination with travellers. Norwich was recovering from the plague years and was a major city, with attractions and social events second only to London itself. The increasingly prosperous country landowners of Norfolk and Suffolk began visiting Norwich more frequently and staying for longer when they did so.

By the end of the 17th century many of the strict regulations regarding trade in Norwich were lifted or relaxed, and Norwich became a fashionable shopping town. Shops catering for the growing wealthy classes, such as booksellers, vintners and gunsmiths, grew around the market plain, especially in the large buildings along the eastern side of the market, the Nethererowe, which became so popular with the gentry it became known as Gentleman's Walk. Gentleman's Walk acquired a number of luxury shops, including John Toll's drapers from which Elizabeth Gurney (later Elizabeth Fry) watched the election of 1796, the wine and spirit dealership of Thomas Bignold who in company with other local shopkeepers founded a mutual association to provide fire insurance for the area's shops which became Norwich Union, and Saunders Coffee House, patronised by the young Horatio and William Nelson.

By this time, a row of stalls bordering on St Peter Mancroft's churchyard had developed into a row of three- and four-storey houses running east to west, and a second row of buildings running north to south ran through the main market square. This row of houses cut off the main market from the eastern strip housing the butchers and fishmongers, known as the Upper Market, leaving only two narrow passageways as direct links between the two-halves of the market square. (Although the buildings dividing the upper and lower markets were demolished in the 1930s, one of these connecting passages survives as Pudding Lane. The name "Pudding Lane" derives from "ped", an archaic word for the large baskets from which itinerant traders sold goods in the market.)

With increased numbers of people visiting Norwich, trade boomed in the inns around the marketplace. In addition to the existing taverns, at least four very large coaching inns opened along Gentleman's Walk. By the latter half of the 18th century, stagecoaches were leaving one or other of the inns almost daily to London, and the inns also served as the hub of a network of frequent services throughout East Anglia.

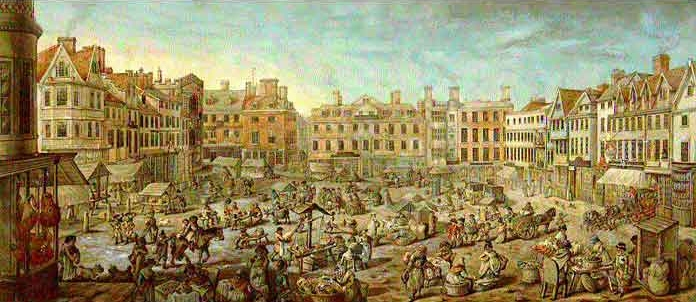
Norwich Market Place by Robert Dighton, 1799. This view is of the northern end of the main (lower) market, looking north towards the Guildhall and Cockey Lane (now London Street). A coach is visible emerging from the narrow entrance to a Gentleman's Walk coaching inn on the right.

Built around long narrow yards, as well as serving food and drink and providing lodgings, these coaching inns also served as temporary warehouses, auction rooms and gambling halls for travellers doing business in the market. The best known was the Angel, parts of which dated to the 15th century. As well as providing the other functions of the Norwich inns, its yard also served as a popular theatre and venue for other performers. (Despite its significance as a city, Norwich did not have a dedicated theatre until 1758.) However, in 1699 part of the building collapsed during a performance by Thomas Doggett's troupe of players, killing a woman and injuring many of the audience. The reputation of the Angel was severely damaged, and although still used for small-scale entertainments such as puppet shows, it was never again used for full-scale theatrical performances.

Meanwhile, the livestock market south of St Peter Mancroft was becoming overwhelmingly crowded on market days. Eventually part of the eastern side of the castle mound was levelled, and in 1738 the livestock sales were moved to this new site. The old hay market remained on the old site for more than a century, until it was also moved to the new livestock market site in the early 19th century. The new livestock market was one of the last significant livestock markets in a British city centre, and developed a reputation as "the cruellest in the country". (Note: The livestock market was eventually relocated out of the city altogether in the 1960s. The locations of both the old and new former livestock market sites survive in the place names Haymarket, on the site of the original livestock market, and Cattle Market Street, the approach road to the new site.)

== 19th century improvements ==
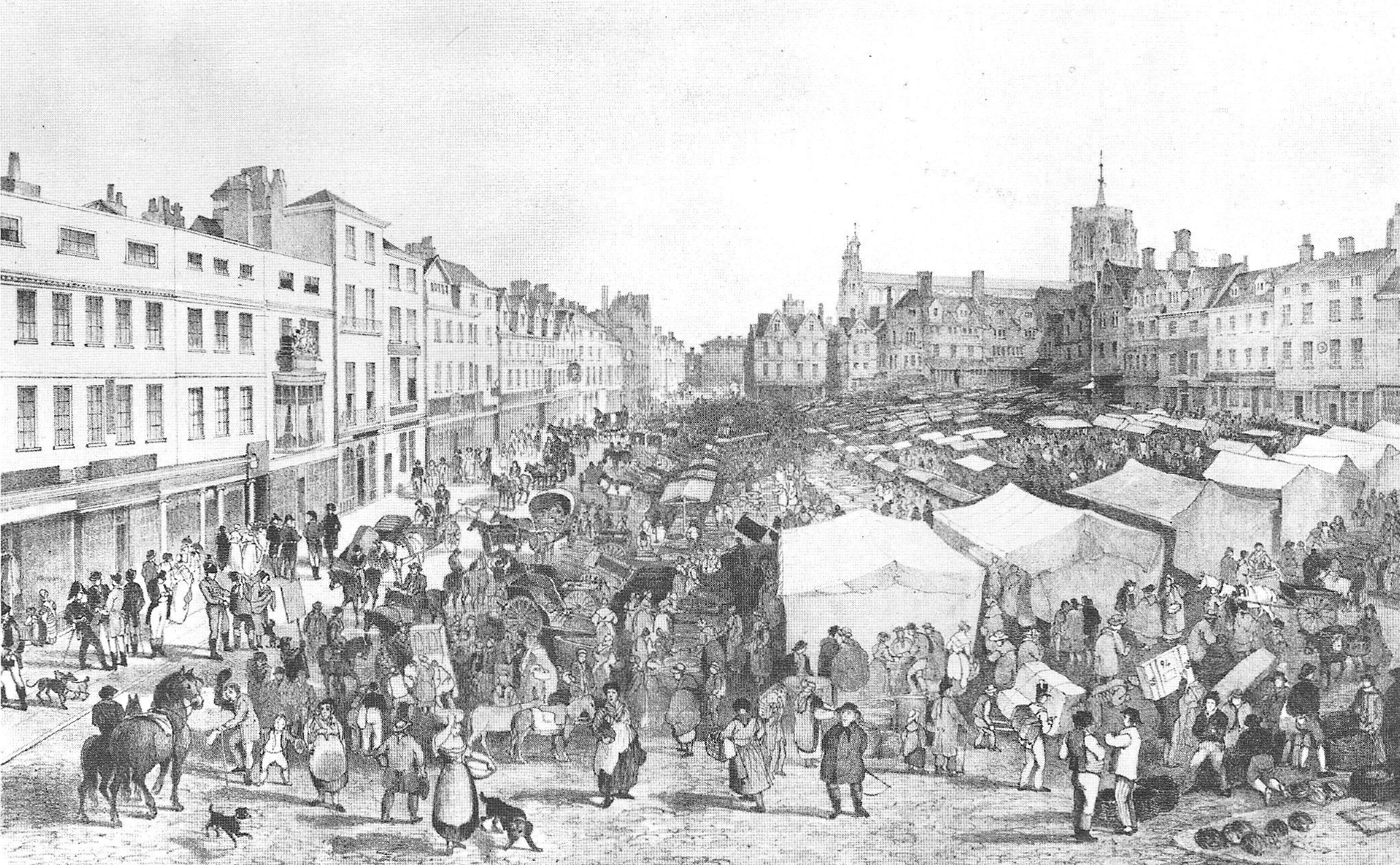
Norwich Market Place, John Sell Cotman, 1806. The view is south from the Guildhall; Gentleman's Walk is on the left. The buildings (right) dividing the upper and main markets were by this time substantial four-storey structures.

The relocation of the livestock market had done little to resolve the problems of congestion in and around the market. Many of the mediaeval access routes to the market were too narrow for wheeled transport, and the narrow alleys were also dark, dangerous and mostly unpaved. Although the market had been resurfaced during the 18th century, this had been with flint pebble cobblestones which were easily dislodged and trapped refuse. William Chase, editor of the first Norwich Directory, lobbied in the late 18th century for civic improvements and a rationalisation of the streets around the market. However, the economy of Norwich depended heavily on the textile industry, which had suffered badly from the loss of export markets during the French Wars, and funds for improvements were limited. By the beginning of the 19th century the only significant improvement had been the paving of Gentleman's Walk. In 1805 a number of Improvement Commissions were established to propose solutions to the problems facing the area, but little action was taken. Local councils had no powers to levy rates to fund general civic improvements and as a consequence funds for improvement works had to be raised either through tolls and rents, via public appeals, or through long term borrowing, and the city was initially unable to raise sufficient funds.

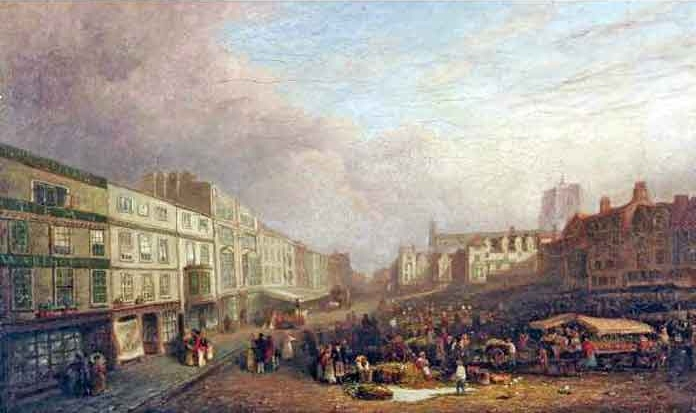
Norwich Market, 1842

In 1813 the yard of the King's Head coaching inn was widened to create Davey Place, a new street between the market and Back of the Inns, at that time a narrow passageway which ran parallel to Gentleman's Walk behind the coaching inns. (Although the inns no longer remain, Back of the Inns survives as a street name.) In 1820 the Gasolier, Norwich's first gas lamp, was installed in the market outside the entrance to Davey Place. Exchange Street, a new road running north from the northeast corner of the market, was completed in 1828 and a roadway was installed alongside the existing footpath. London Street, the main road connecting the market with the older areas of the city around Tombland and the Cathedral was widened in 1856. In 1860 the decrepit fish market adjacent to the Guildhall, by now over 700 years old, was replaced with a new neoclassical building. In 1863 Gentleman's Walk was paved properly with York stone, and in 1874 the cobbles of the marketplace were replaced by timber blocks. Although by this time the market operated on all working days, Sunday trading laws meant it was closed on Sundays. The market space on Sundays was used for public assemblies and gatherings.

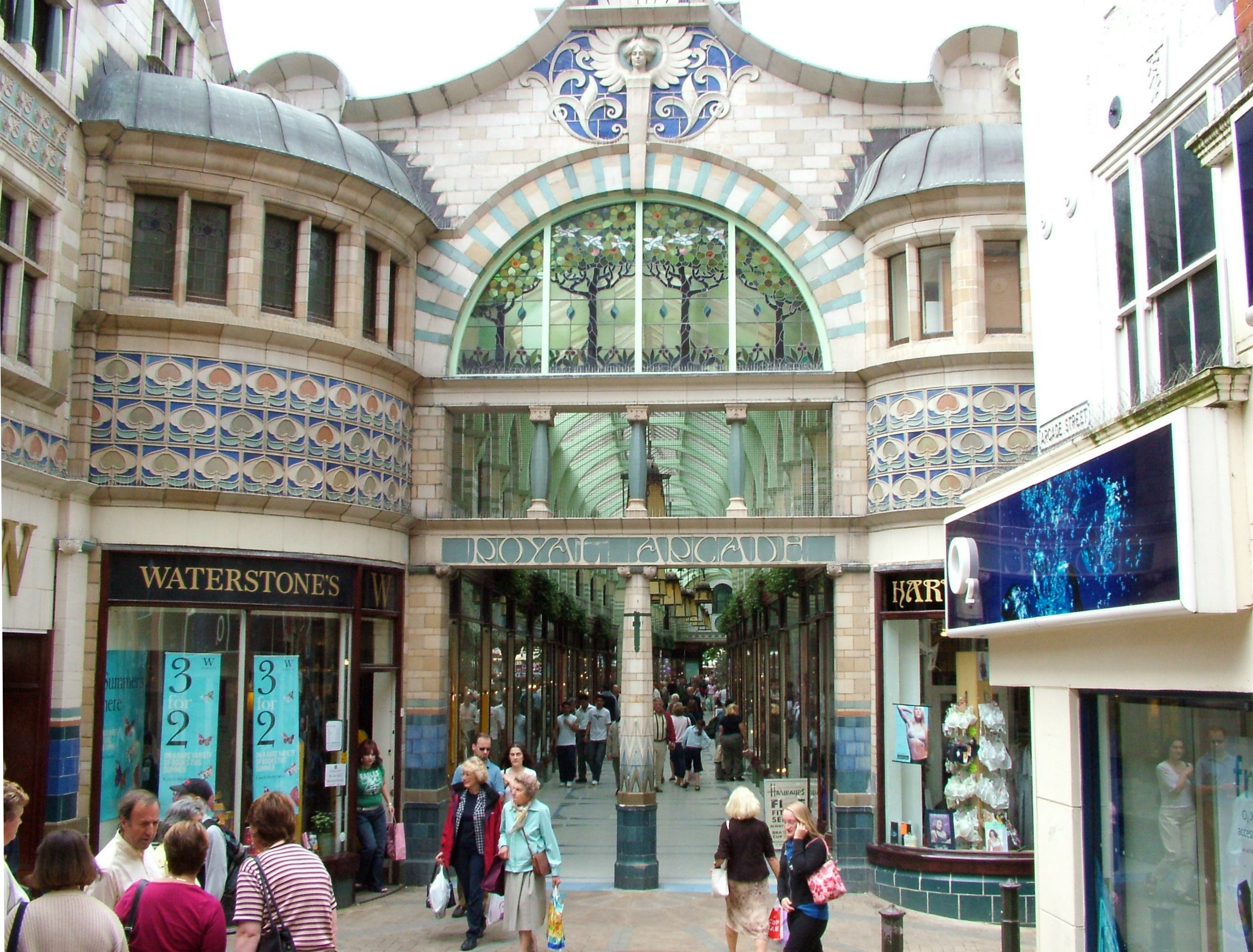
The Royal Arcade

Meanwhile, Norwich railway station had opened in 1844. Although many Norwich residents were reluctant to use the railway, and goods carriers initially found it more convenient to continue to collect goods from the coaching inns, as railway usage gradually increased the number of coaches and carts calling at the inns slowly dwindled, reducing congestion. In 1899 the Angel inn—renamed the Royal Hotel in 1840 on the occasion of Queen Victoria's wedding—finally closed, and was replaced with George Skipper's Royal Arcade, a shopping centre in the Art Nouveau style.

Although the civic authorities initially resisted installing tramways in the city centre owing to concerns about nuisance and disruption, they eventually relented; by the end of the 19th century Norwich had a total of 16 miles (26 km) of tram routes, including a route along Gentleman's Walk itself. While schemes to rationalise the layout of the market's stalls had been proposed since the 18th century, they had foundered on the fact that so many of the stalls were privately owned.

== 1930s redevelopment ==
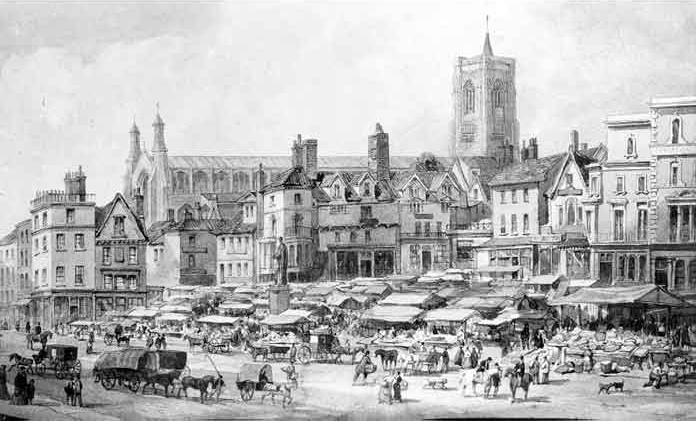
Norwich Market in the 1850s

In the wake of the First World War the council's Markets Committee began a programme of gradually buying back all the privately owned stalls, with the intention of encouraging demobilised servicemen to work on the market. Within a few years the market was entirely publicly owned, and the council took responsibility for the upkeep of the market. The city also bought out and closed many of the 30 or more inns in the area, transferring their licences to the growing suburbs.

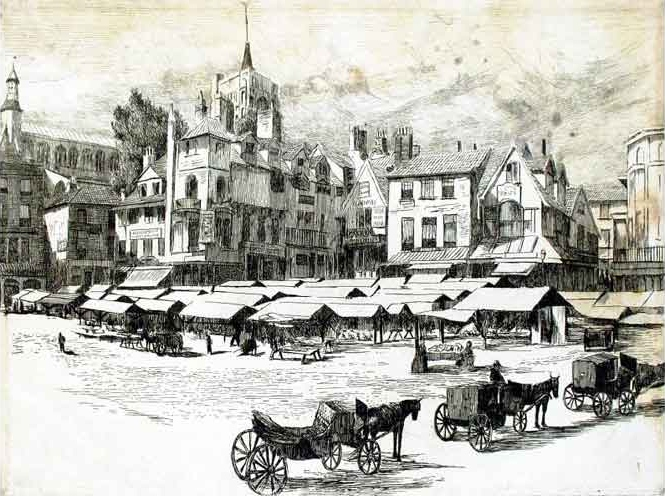
Buildings at the southern end of Norwich Market, 1879, by Edwin Edwards

Meanwhile, the Guildhall, designed to serve the post-plague city with a population of around 6,000, was hopelessly inadequate as the administrative centre of a major modern city. As an interim solution the row of buildings dividing the upper and main markets had mostly been taken into public ownership and converted into civic offices, and in January 1914 the 1860 fish market had also been enlarged and converted into offices. The Liberal welfare reforms of the early 20th century and the Local Government Act 1929 had greatly increased the role of local government in public health and welfare, and by the 1930s Norwich council was suffering from a severe lack of office space.

The council opted for a radical redevelopment of the area around the upper market. The row of buildings from St Peter Mancroft to the Guildhall, which divided the upper and lower markets, were demolished, opening up the marketplace, as were the buildings along the western side of the market. The mixture of stalls and booths which occupied the market itself were all removed, and replaced by 205 stalls in uniform parallel rows, topped with multi-coloured sloping roofs (known locally as "tilts"). During the rebuilding of the market square, the existing stalls were relocated to a number of temporary locations in the area to allow them to continue trading, including the courtyard and rear of the City Hall development and surrounding streets. In 1938 the coverings of the stalls were given the multi-coloured stripes for which they became famous.

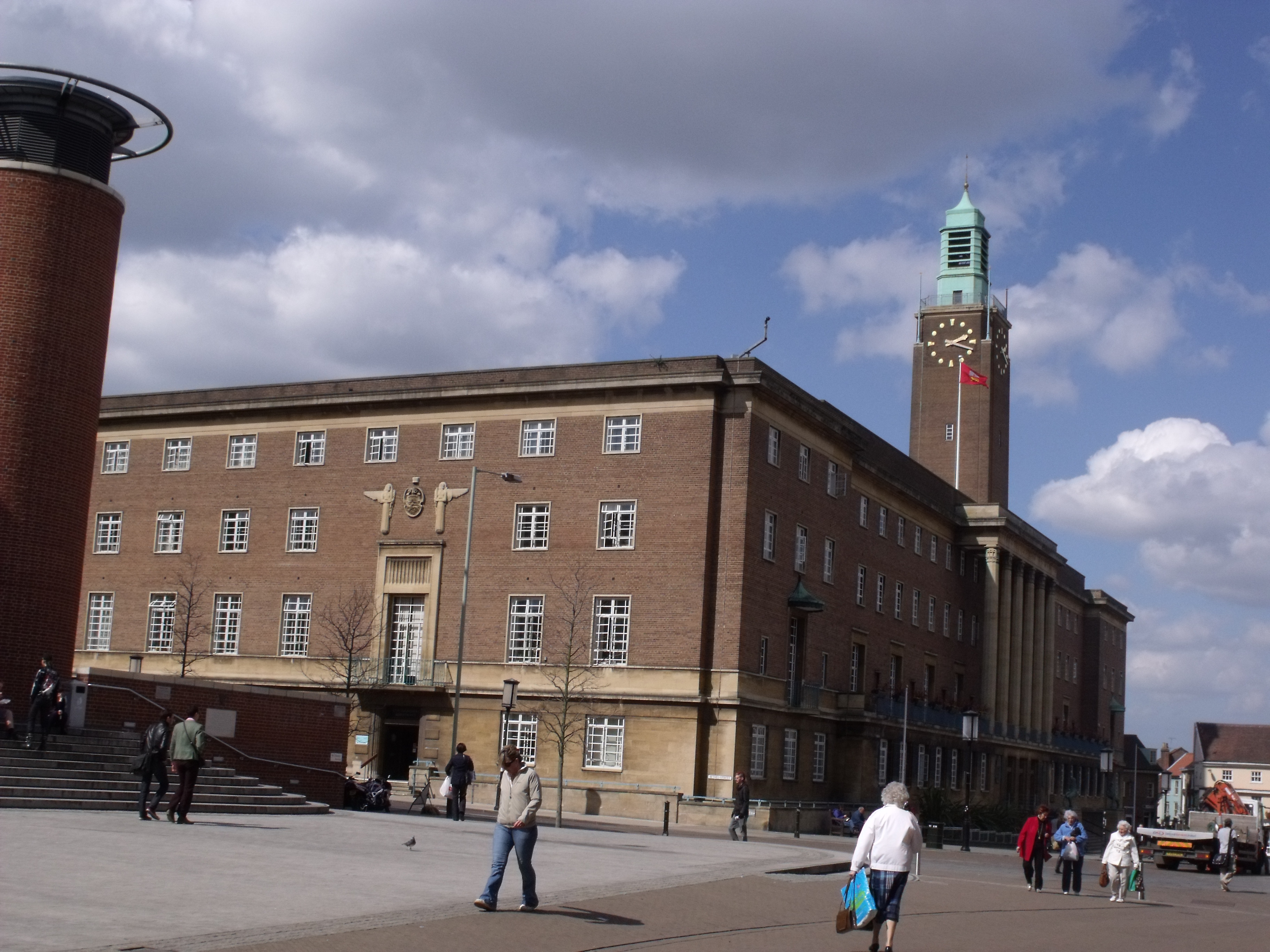
City Hall

In 1932, despite concerns from some local residents and businesses about the huge expense at a time of recession, a new building was envisaged to replace the demolished civic buildings, spanning the entire length of the western edge of the now unified marketplace. From over 140 entries a design by Charles Holloway James and Stephen Rowland Pierce was selected. Heavily influenced by Scandinavian architecture, the design attracted negative criticism at the time, with John Piper saying that "fog is its friend". Opened by King George VI in 1938 as City Hall, (Note: Following the opening of City Hall, George VI attended Carrow Road to watch Norwich City play Millwall in the Football League Second Division, the first time a reigning British monarch had attended a league football match. Norwich City lost 2–0.) the building proved extremely successful, and was described by Nikolaus Pevsner as "the foremost English public building between the Wars". Norwich's war memorial, designed by Edwin Lutyens and opened in 1927 outside the Guildhall, was moved to a long narrow memorial garden on a raised terrace between City Hall and the enlarged market shortly after the opening of City Hall. The Guildhall remained in use as a law court until 1985, and its basement remained in use as cells until that time.

== 1976 renovation ==
Although superficially the market remained little changed in the decades following the 1930s redevelopment, by the 1960s it was falling into disrepair, and it no longer met modern hygiene regulations. A lack of funds delayed improvement works, and renovation works did not begin until February 1976. Hot and cold running water and refrigeration were provided to those stalls handling food, and many of the stalls were converted into lockable units. New electrical mains cables were installed throughout the market, the site was resurfaced, and the elegant but ageing 19th century lavatories were demolished. Aside from the demolition of the Victorian toilets, the only significant visible alteration was the addition of corrugated plastic covers over the walkways between the stalls. Although competition from supermarkets was by this time affecting shopping patterns, and the decline of market gardening meant a virtual end to stall-holders selling their own produce, the market survived competitive pressures. Many stalls diversified into specialist foods, clothing and other goods and the high number of stalls allowed the market to sell a range of goods as great as that provided by the supermarkets.

== 2005 rebuilding ==
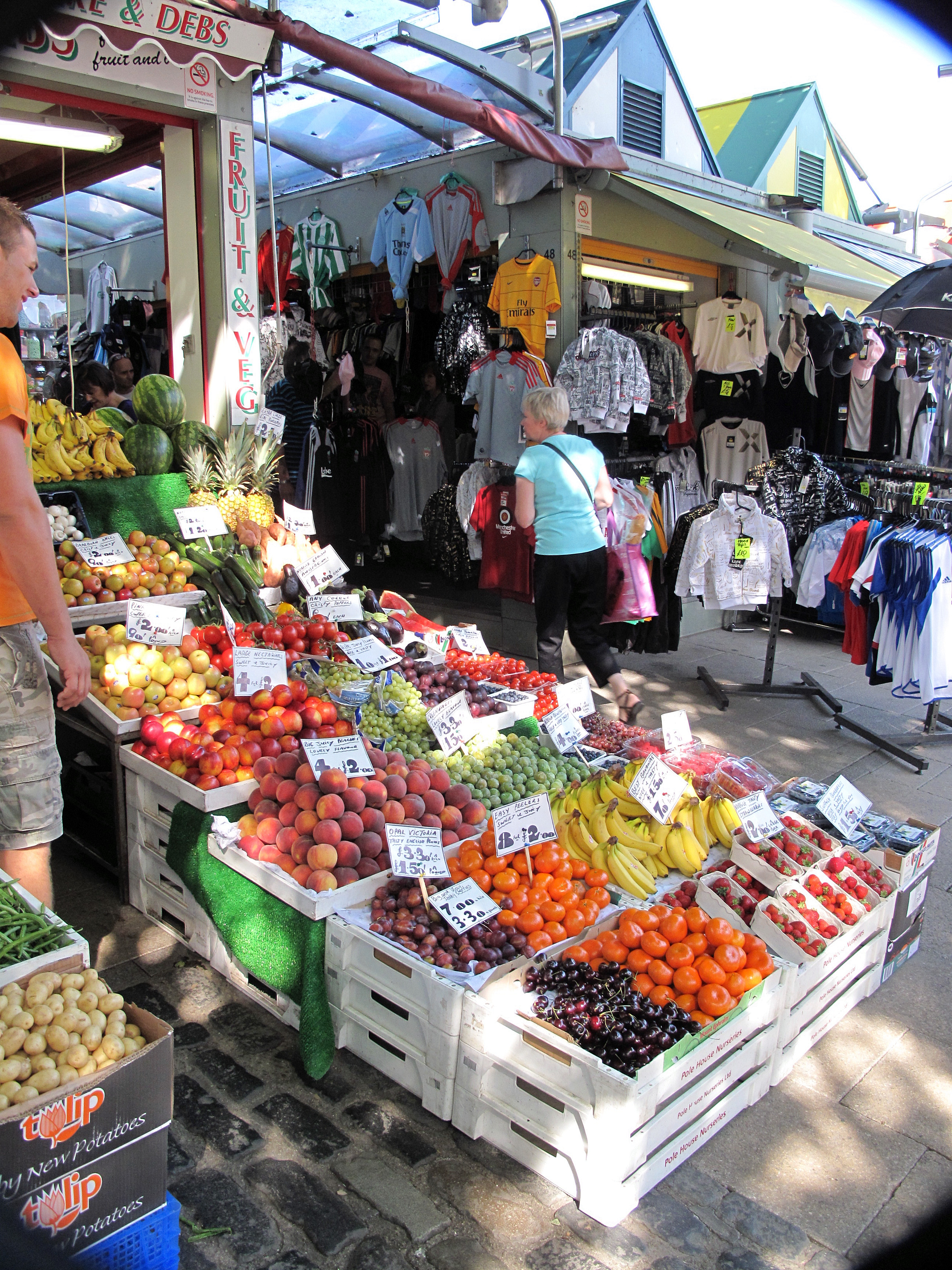
Supermarket competition has reduced the number of greengrocers' stalls, but the market remains a significant retailer of food, clothing and specialist goods

While the 1976 renovations prolonged the life of the 1930s market, by the 1990s the market was once more becoming decrepit. The covers erected in 1976 over the walkways blocked sunlight, leaving much of the market dingy and poorly lit. The walkways themselves, already narrow, were becoming even more restricted as stalls erected external displays and additional weatherproofing. Removable shutters used to secure the stalls overnight were stacked against the sides of the stalls during trading hours, causing further obstruction, while on those stalls fitted with doors the doors opened outwards to maximise the limited space inside the units. In addition, the floors of stalls followed the slope of the hill, a gradient of about 1:12, causing health problems for those market workers who had to stand at this angle for prolonged periods during the day. Norwich City Council decided that these problems needed to be addressed, and in December 2003 invited the public to choose between three proposals for a rebuilt market.

These plans were extremely controversial. All three envisaged reducing the number of stalls from 205 to 140–160 to increase space, and all three involved splitting the market into isolated clusters of stalls, significantly altering its character and appearance. The Eastern Daily Press organised a campaign against the perceived unattractiveness of the designs, the proposed reduction in the number of stalls which would mean stallholders losing their jobs and the remaining stallholders facing rent increases to cover the difference, and the change to the character of central Norwich that such a radical redesign of the market would entail. A petition of over 12,000 signatories rejecting all three proposed designs was gathered.

Following a public meeting on 26 January 2004 the council backed down, and Hereward Cooke, deputy leader of the council, said that "We are finding out what the stall-holders and people of Norwich want and we will try our best to fulfill their wishes". Architect Michael Innes proposed a new design, which was accepted by the council. The new design was put in place in 2005.

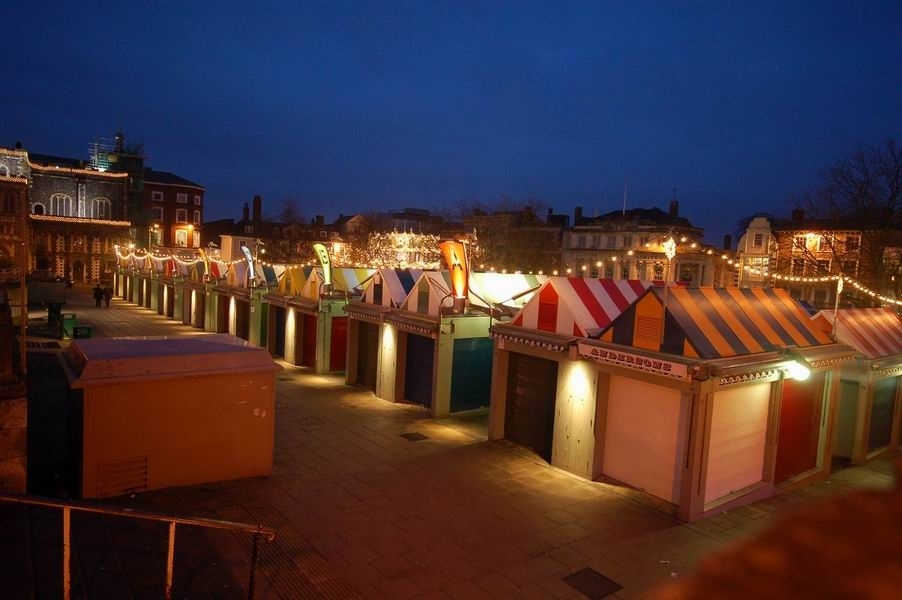
The 2005 redevelopment replaced the existing rows of stalls with "pods" of four stalls each

Innes's design retained the market's layout of parallel rows of stalls with striped coloured roofs. The new stalls were built as steel and aluminium prefabricated units consisting of four stalls each, each stall having a level floor accessed by a step. These "pods" were arranged in rows, with 2-metre (6 ft 7 in) wide walkways between the "pods". Transparent retractable canopies were installed above the aisles, which could be opened and closed centrally.

To allow the market to continue trading while the rebuilding took place, a set of temporary stalls were built in Gentleman's Walk and surrounding streets. A third of the market's stalls at a time traded from these temporary stalls while their stalls in the main market were replaced, a process taking four months for each third of the market. The rebuilding was officially completed on 25 March 2006. Although generally popular with traders and shoppers, the redesign was criticised by The Times, who described it as "an anaemic shopping mall for health and safety inspectors: straight lines, wipe-clean boxy cubicles, all life and love drained out."

Meanwhile, in November 2004 engineers identified cracks in the terrace supporting the Memorial Gardens, and they were closed to the public as a potential hazard. Eventually in 2009 work began on renovating the gardens. Lutyens's memorial was dismantled and cleaned, and reassembled at a higher level to be visible from the street; it was also rotated 180° to face City Hall, rather than the market. The terrace was strengthened, and the gardens were landscaped around a new sculpture by Paul de Monchaux on the original site of the memorial.

Supermarkets continued to affect shopping patterns. In 1979 fruit and vegetable stalls occupied 70 of the market's 205 stalls; by 1988 greengrocers occupied only 28 stalls, and by 2010 there were only seven remaining fruit and vegetable stalls on the market. A wide variety of other stalls have taken their place, and the market remains active. One of the largest markets in Britain, it is a tourist attraction as well as remaining heavily used by local residents, and is a focal point of the city.

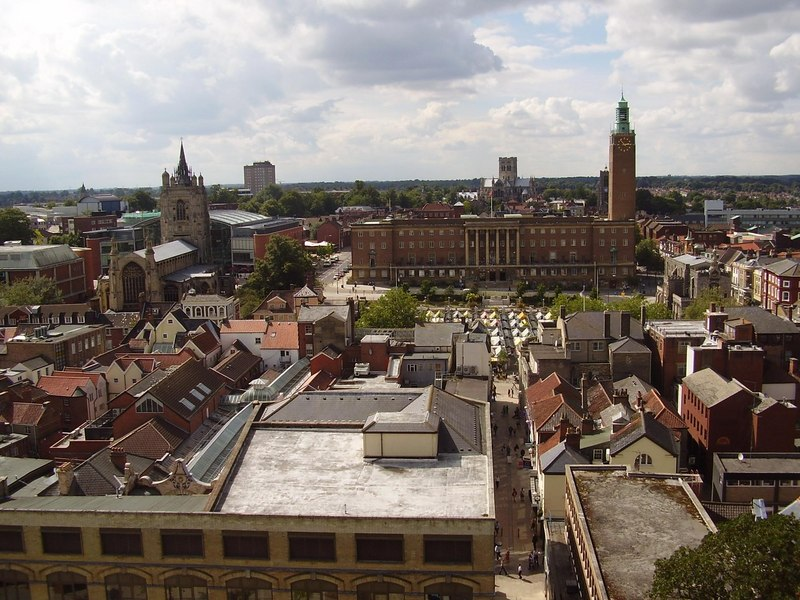
Norwich market and surrounding buildings immediately after the 2005 reconstruction, looking west from Norwich Castle. Although some buildings have been replaced or renovated, the mediaeval layout remains almost unchanged. From left to right (south to north), significant landmarks are: St Peter Mancroft, with the high glass structure of The Forum immediately behind it; City Hall with St John the Baptist Roman Catholic Cathedral behind it, Lutyens's war memorial immediately in front of it and Norwich Market in front of the war memorial; Guildhall. The Sir Garnet Wolseley pub (with pyramid-shaped roof) is immediately in front of the section of St Peter Mancroft's churchyard which was the cloth market prior to 1369; while the building in its current form dates only to 1861, a tavern has stood on this site since the earliest days of the market. (Note: The Sir Garnet Wolseley was built in 1861 on the site of the Baron of Beef tavern. It incorporates parts of the mediaeval building in its structure.) The pedestrian precinct running from the castle to the market is Davey Place, the former yard of the King's Head inn.

== Notes and references ==
=== Bibliography ===
- Adderson, Richard; Kenworthy, Graham (1998). Branch Lines Around Cromer. Midhurst: Middleton Press. ISBN 1-901706-26-5.
- A Market For Our Times. Norwich: Norwich Heritage Projects. 2010. ISBN 978-0-9566272-0-9.
- Dunn, Penny (2005). Harper-Bill, Christopher (ed.). Medieval East Anglia. Woodbridge, Suffolk: Boydell Press. ISBN 978-1-84383-151-8.
- Kelly, John (2006). The Great Mortality. London: Harper Perennial. ISBN 0-00-715070-9.
- Priestley, Ursula (1987). The Great Market. Norwich: Centre of East Anglian Studies, University of East Anglia. ISBN 0-906219-25-6.
- Richardson, R. C.; James, T. B. (1983). The Urban Experience: A Sourcebook : English, Scottish, and Welsh towns, 1450–1700. Manchester: Manchester University Press. ISBN 0-7190-0900-6.
