= Edwin Edwards (artist) =

British painter, engraver and lawyer

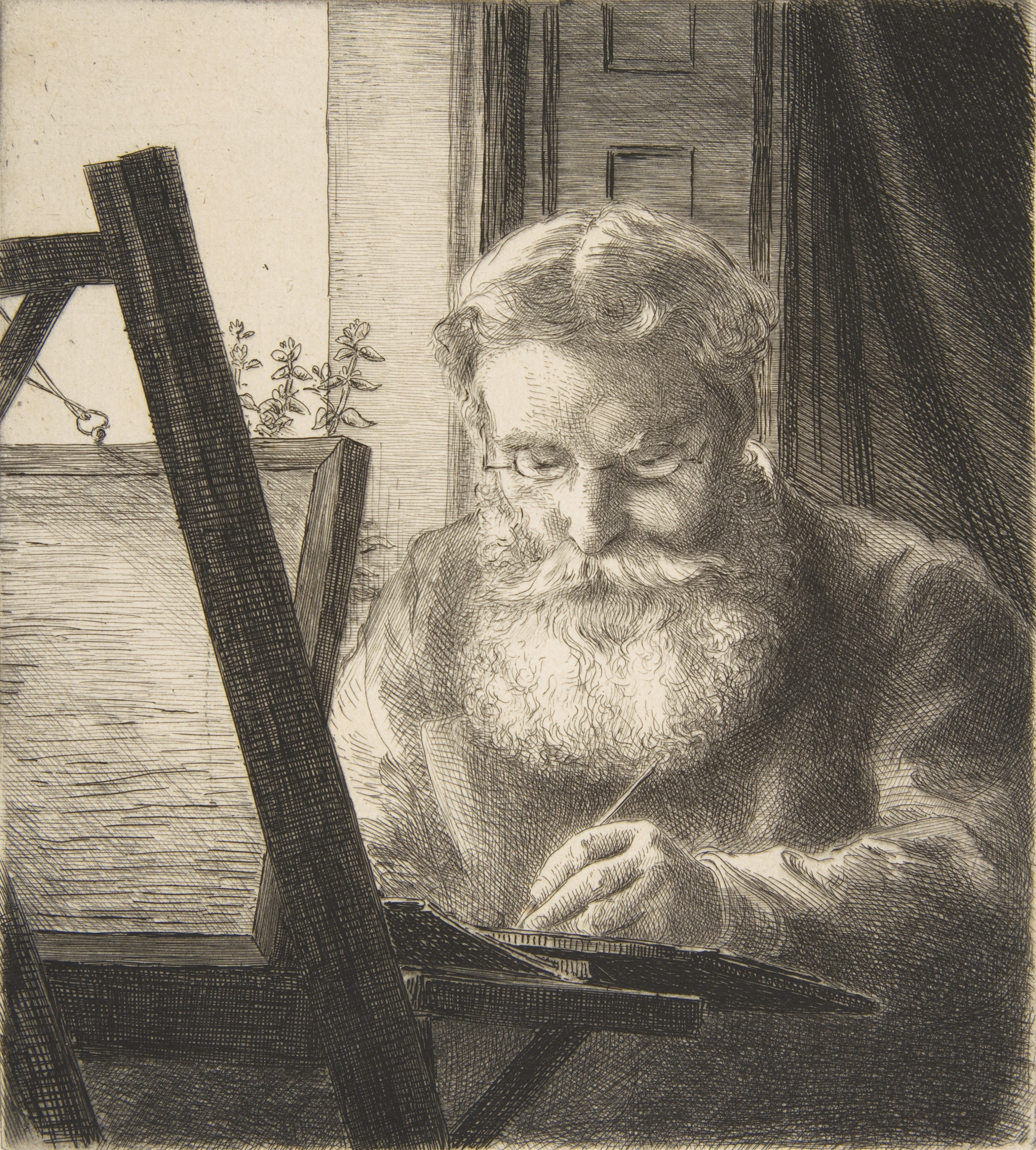
Edwin Edwards, drypoint by Félix Bracquemond (1872)

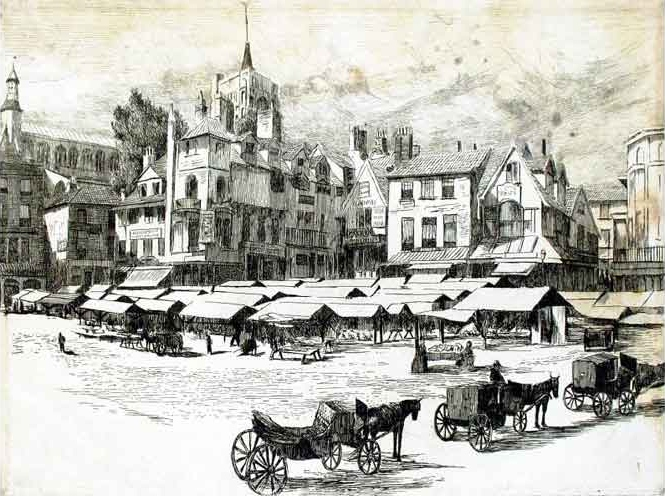
Market Taverns, Norwich, by Edwards

Edwin Edwards (6 January 1823 – 15 September 1879) was a British landscape painter in watercolours and oils, etcher and lawyer.

== Life and work ==
Edwin Edwards was born in Framlingham, Suffolk in 1823 the son of a Norfolk squire. He trained as a lawyer and held the legal post of the King's Proctor and Examiner of the Courts of Civil Law and the High Court of Admiralty courts until 1861, when at the age of 38 he retired from the profession and devoted himself to art. In 1847, Edwards published A treatise on the jurisdiction of the High Court of Admiralty of England.

Edwards was inspired to become an etcher by the French artist Henri Fantin-Latour, whom he first met in Paris in 1861. Fantin-Latour made a return visit to Edwards at his Sunbury-on-Thames home and legend has it Edwards decided to become an artist that instant. Edwards went on to become a successful landscape painter and etcher, based in Sunbury and London. His subjects were mainly views in the south of England, especially Devon and Cornwall. Initially he painted mainly in watercolour, but under the influence of his French friends he turned to oil painting.

He was well connected within European artistic circles, befriending and being encouraged in particular by Alphonse Legros and James McNeill Whistler, the latter also sharing a passion for vocal music. In 1861 Edwards made an etching trip along the Thames with Whistler, Fantin-Latour and Francis Seymour Haden during which he executed a portrait of Whistler sketching, seated, at Moulsey lock. Charles Keene was also a friend of Edwards as well as Jacques-Emile Blanche, Édouard Manet, Swinburne and Jacquemart.

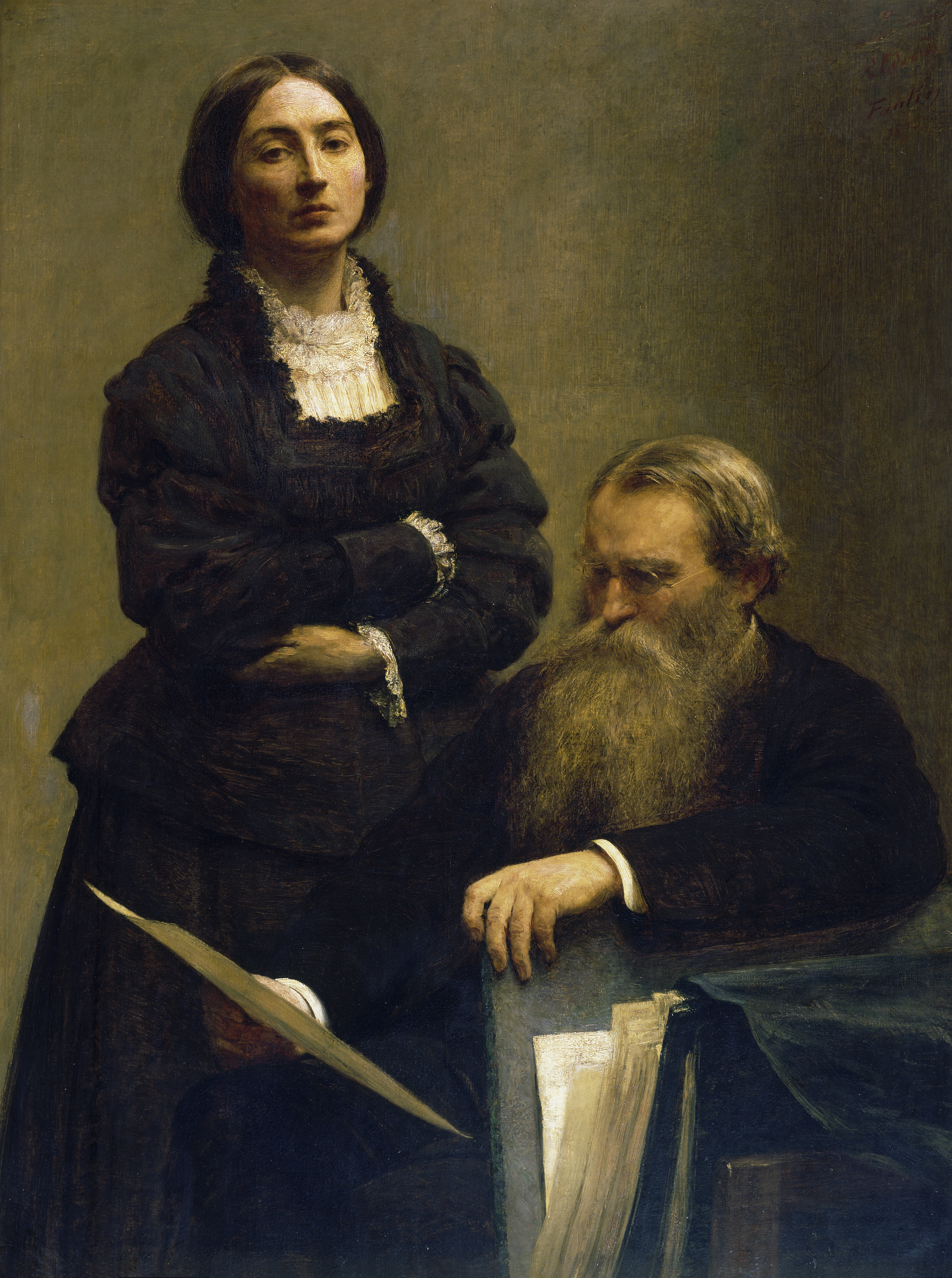
Portrait of Edwin Edwards and His Wife by Henri Fantin-Latour

In a letter of 1874 Fantin-Latour described a projected double portrait which would depict Edwards sitting working at his etching table with his wife at his side 'like a guardian angel'. By February 1875 the couple were in Paris for the sittings. In the final painting, the artist produced a modified version of his first idea. Edwards sits at an angle, seemingly unaware of the spectator, while his wife faces the viewer with an uncompromising stare. The portrait was exhibited at the Salon of 1875, where it received a second-class medal. It was donated to the Tate Gallery by Ruth Edwards in 1904 and is currently on loan to the National Gallery, London.

A French art critic wrote in 1879, "Edwin Edwards ira à la posterité, non seulement par ses œuvres, mais aussi par ses amitiés. On se rappelle le magnifique tableau où M. Fantin-Latour a peint les portraits de l'artiste et de sa femme". ("Edwin Edwards will live on in posterity, not only by his works, but also by his friendships. One remembers the splendid painting by Mr. Fantin-Latour depicting Edwards and his wife").

== Exhibitions ==
Edwards was a prolific exhibitor, exhibiting no less than fifty-four works at the Royal Academy and one hundred and one works at various other institutions in the 19th century. After his death in 1879, a memorial exhibition was held by the Continental Gallery, London.

== Written works ==
- A treatise on the jurisdiction of the High Court of Admiralty of England (Benning & Co, 1847).
- Rossetti, W. M. & Edwards, Edwin (Ill.). The Poetical Works of H. W. Longfellow (E. Moxon, 1870).
- Inns and Outs: Old Inns of England (1873–1881, unfinished).
