= Chapel Field Road drill hall =

Former military installation in Norwich, England

- Norwich, Norfolk
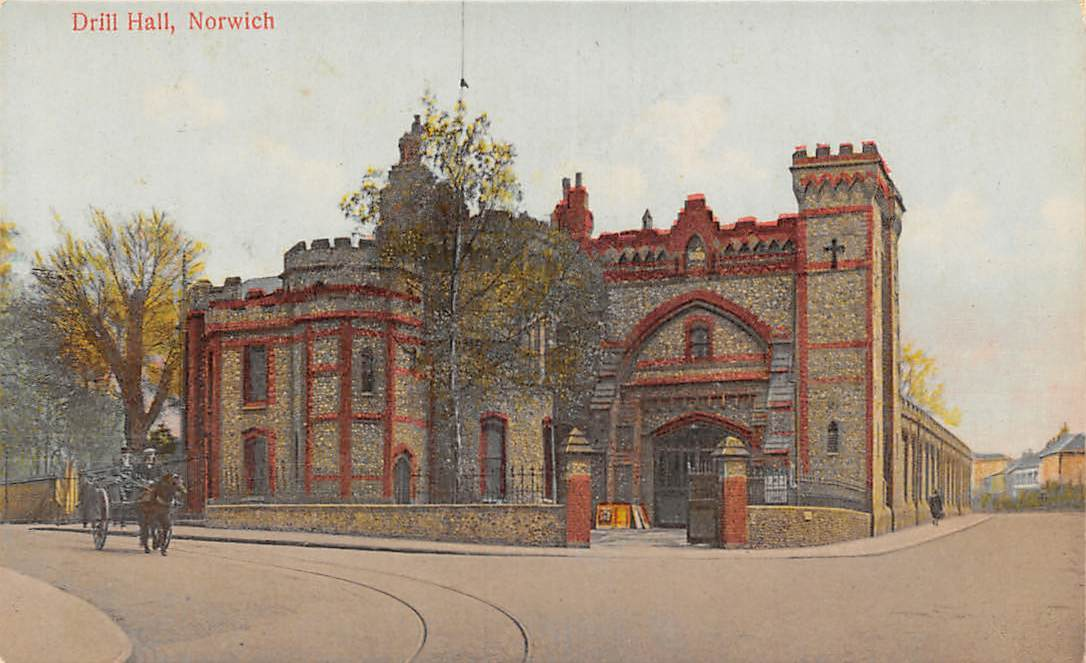
- Chapel Field Road drill hall

Site information
- Type: Drill hall

Location
- Location in Norfolk
- Coordinates: 52.62801°N 1.28583°E

Site history
- Built: 1866
- Built for: War Office
- In use: 1866 – 1959

The Chapel Field Road drill hall was a military installation in Norwich, Norfolk.

== History ==
The building, which was designed by James Benest in the Gothic style to incorporate part of a tower from the old city wall and built by William Gilbert, was opened by the Prince and Princess of Wales in October 1866. It was initially used by elements of the 1st Norfolk Rifle Volunteer Corps which became the 1st Volunteer Battalion, The Norfolk Regiment in 1883. It became the headquarters of the 4th Territorial Battalion the Norfolk Regiment when that battalion moved from the Bethel Street drill hall during the First World War. The battalion was mobilised at the Chapel Field Road drill hall in September 1939 for service in the Middle East and then the Far East during the Second World War. Following the amalgamations that lead to the formation of the 1st East Anglian Regiment in 1959, the Chapel Field Road drill hall was decommissioned and then demolished to make way for the ring road in 1963.
