= Bethel Street drill hall =

Grade II* listed former military installation

Bethel Street drill hall office
- Norwich, Norfolk
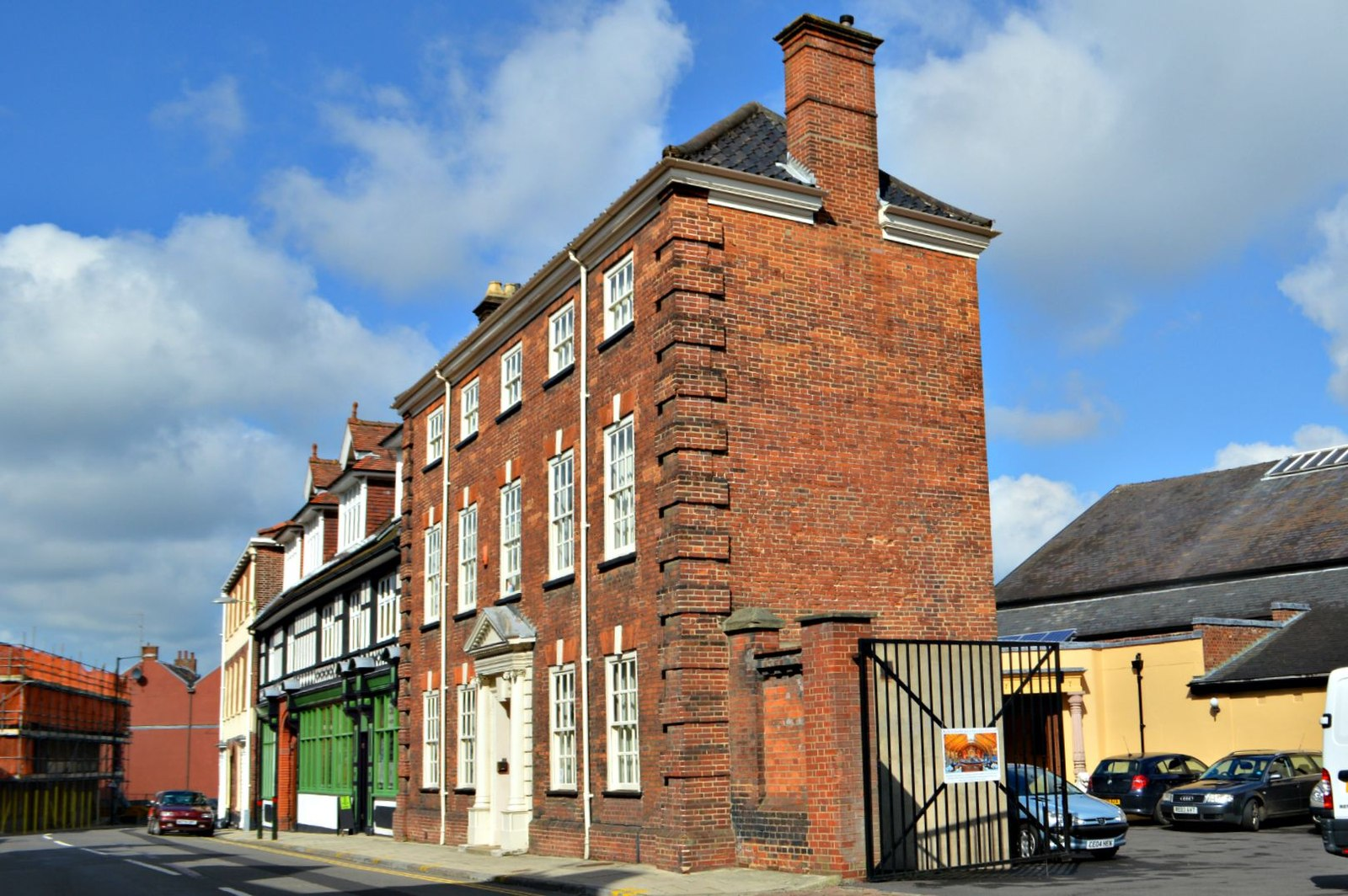
- The frontage of the Bethel Street drill hall office (with the green windows); the former skating rink, yellow building next door would have been suitably large enough to be used as a drill hall.

Site information
- Type: Drill hall

Location
- Location in Norfolk
- Coordinates: 52.62846°N 1.28939°E

Site history
- Built: c.1895
- Built for: War Office
- In use: c.1895 – 1920

The Bethel Street drill hall office is a former military installation in Norwich, Norfolk. It is a Grade II* listed building.

== History ==
No. 48 has a small 15th century undercroft. The existing brick building (mock Tudor rendering) was completed in the late 19th century. The original home of the Ancient Order of Foresters, it became the headquarters of the 2nd East Anglian Field Ambulance Royal Army Medical Corps and, probably, of the 1st Volunteer Battalion, the Norfolk Regiment as well around that time. The 1st Volunteer Battalion, the Norfolk Regiment, whose address was in St Giles (currently the home of the Salvation Army), evolved to become the 4th Battalion, the Norfolk Regiment in 1908. The battalion was mobilised at St Giles before being deployed to Gallipoli and then to Egypt and Palestine. The battalion then moved to the Chapel Field Road drill hall (since demolished) later in the war. The Bethel Street properties were subsequently decommissioned. The building became a bible printers (Goose Press), and then Modern Press. The premises are now owned by a Climate change education charity, the Greenhouse Trust.
