= Grade II* listed buildings in Norwich =

There are over 20,000 Grade II* listed buildings in England. This page is a list of these buildings in the city of Norwich in the county of Norfolk.

== Buildings ==
Name	Location	Type	Completed (Note: The date given is the date used by Historic England as significant for the initial building or that of an important part in the structure's description.)	Date designated	Grid ref. (Note: The grid reference is based on the British national grid reference system, sometimes known as OSGB36, used by the Ordnance Survey.) Geo-coordinates	Entry number (Note: The "List Entry Number" is a unique number assigned to each listed building and scheduled monument by Historic England.)	Image
Augustine Steward's House	Norwich	House	17th century	26 February 1954	TG2332108860; 52°37′53″N 1°17′55″E	1372527	Augustine Steward's House More images
Henry Bacon's House, Colegate	Norwich	Apartment		26 February 1954	TG2303309030; 52°37′59″N 1°17′40″E	1051320	Henry Bacon's House, Colegate More images
Bethel Hospital	Norwich	Psychiatric Hospital	C17/early C18	8 April 1986	TG2272108455; 52°37′41″N 1°17′22″E	1051362	Bethel Hospital More images
Bishop Bridge	Norwich	Bridge	c. 1340	26 February 1954	TG2399308991; 52°37′57″N 1°18′31″E	1205642	Bishop Bridge More images
Bishop Renold's Chapel	Norwich	Library		26 February 1954	TG2349208987; 52°37′57″N 1°18′04″E	1206255	Upload Photo
Bishop Salmon's Porch	Norwich	Great Hall	Early 14th century	26 February 1954	TG2350109018; 52°37′58″N 1°18′05″E	1051329	Bishop Salmon's Porch More images
Church of St Andrew	Eaton	Church	15th century	26 February 1954	TG2025405966; 52°36′24″N 1°15′05″E	1206191	Church of St Andrew More images
Church of St Catherine	Mile Cross, Norwich	Church	1933–1935	21 August 2006	TG2195110923; 52°39′02″N 1°16′47″E	1391746	Church of St Catherine More images
Church of St John and All Saints	Lakenham, Norwich	Church	15th century	26 February 1954	TG2335406088; 52°36′24″N 1°17′50″E	1372796	Church of St John and All Saints More images
City Hall including Police Station	Norwich	Town Hall	1932–38	29 January 1971	TG2284408475; 52°37′42″N 1°17′29″E	1210484	City Hall including Police Station More images
Cotman House	Norwich	Apartment		26 February 1954	TG2341809076; 52°38′00″N 1°18′01″E	1051854	Cotman House More images
Cringleford Bridge	Norwich	Road Bridge	1520	19 October 1951	TG1998305952; 52°36′24″N 1°14′51″E	1050565	Cringleford Bridge More images
Dolphin Inn	Norwich	Bishops Palace/Health Centre	1587(?)	26 February 1954	TG2195009766; 52°38′25″N 1°16′44″E	1372818	Dolphin Inn More images
Earlham Hall and attached Outbuildings	Earlham, Norwich	House	Late 16th century	26 February 1954	TG1915308001; 52°37′32″N 1°14′12″E	1051296	Earlham Hall and attached Outbuildings More images
Friends Meeting House	Norwich	Chapel	1826	26 February 1954	TG2280208656; 52°37′48″N 1°17′27″E	1051780	Upload Photo
General Post Office Museum	Norwich	Timber Framed House	15th century	21 September 1970	TG2306208713; 52°37′49″N 1°17′41″E	1051892	General Post Office Museum More images
Haydn House	47 and 48 The Close	House	18th century	26 February 1954	TG2367008868; 52°37′53″N 1°18′13″E	1280233	Haydn House More images
Holkham House	Norwich	Apartment		26 February 1954	TG2253108686; 52°37′49″N 1°17′13″E	1206535	Upload Photo
Howard's House	Norwich	House	17th century	26 February 1954	TG2346808307; 52°37′35″N 1°18′01″E	1372824	Howard's House More images
Inverleith	Norwich	Courtyard House	1908-9	11 February 2004	TG2199407045; 52°36′57″N 1°16′40″E	1391059	Upload Photo
Lazar House	Norwich			26 February 1954	TG2356510413; 52°38′43″N 1°18′12″E	1051828	Lazar House More images
Manor House	Norwich	House	1578	26 February 1954	TG2375207444; 52°37′07″N 1°18′14″E	1051379	Manor House More images
Norfolk Terrace and attached Walkways at the University of East Anglia	University of East Anglia, Norwich	Hall of Residence	1964–1968	16 October 2003	TG1923407406; 52°37′12″N 1°14′14″E	1390647	Norfolk Terrace and attached Walkways at the University of East Anglia More images
Nos. 39 & 41, St Andrew's Street (the Festival House)	Norwich	Public House	19th century	5 June 1972	TG2311308756; 52°37′50″N 1°17′44″E	1372492	Nos. 39 & 41, St Andrew's Street (the Festival House) More images
Nos. 31–35, Magdalen Street and Gurney Court	Norwich	House	1986	26 February 1954	TG2317809190; 52°38′04″N 1°17′48″E	1051188	Nos. 31–35, Magdalen Street and Gurney Court More images
Octagon Chapel	Norwich	Presbyterian Chapel	1756	26 February 1954	TG2308009071; 52°38′01″N 1°17′43″E	1280186	Octagon Chapel More images
Old Post Office Yard behind No. 19 Bedford Street to right of Carriage Arch	Norwich	House	15th century	15 October 1970	TG2307308670; 52°37′48″N 1°17′41″E	1205180	Old Post Office Yard behind No. 19 Bedford Street to right of Carriage Arch
Precinct Wall	Norwich	Cathedral Close	13th century	5 June 1972	TG2343109027; 52°37′59″N 1°18′01″E	1051331	Precinct Wall
Printing Museum, Jarrold's Printing Works	Norwich	Warehouse	C20	8 April 1986	TG2341309260; 52°38′06″N 1°18′01″E	1211208	Upload Photo
Pykerell's House	Norwich	Hall House	15th century	26 February 1954	TG2280509090; 52°38′02″N 1°17′28″E	1290996	Upload Photo
Red Lion Public House	Eaton, Norwich	Inn	Late 17th century	26 February 1954	TG2018906119; 52°36′30″N 1°15′02″E	1372802	Red Lion Public House More images
Remains of Monastic Infirmary	Norwich	Monastery	1175–1200	5 June 1972	TG2351008812; 52°37′52″N 1°18′05″E	1051313	Remains of Monastic Infirmary More images
Royal Arcade	Norwich	Shop	C20	5 June 1972	TG2302708474; 52°37′41″N 1°17′38″E	1205148	Royal Arcade More images
Sainsbury Centre, Attached Walkway, Underground Loading Bay, and Retaining Walls to Loading Bay Access Road at the University of	Norwich	Art Gallery	1977	19 December 2012	TG1906307438; 52°37′14″N 1°14′05″E	1409810	Sainsbury Centre, Attached Walkway, Underground Loading Bay, and Retaining Walls to Loading Bay Access Road at the University of More images
St Catherine's Close	Norwich	House	1780	26 February 1954	TG2307907956; 52°37′25″N 1°17′40″E	1051385	St Catherine's Close More images
St Helen's House	Norwich	House	18th century	5 June 1972	TG2366309052; 52°37′59″N 1°18′14″E	1051366	Upload Photo
Suffolk Terrace and adjoining Walkway and Stairs to Rear at the University of East Anglia	University of East Anglia, Norwich	Hall of Residence	1964–1968	16 October 2003	TG1943007413; 52°37′12″N 1°14′25″E	1390646	Suffolk Terrace and adjoining Walkway and Stairs to Rear at the University of East Anglia More images
Telephone House	Norwich	Office	1906	5 June 1972	TG2270308593; 52°37′46″N 1°17′21″E	1372484	Upload Photo
The Briton's Arms	Norwich	Restaurant		26 February 1954	TG2319308827; 52°37′53″N 1°17′48″E	1372804	The Briton's Arms More images
The Louis Marchesi Public House	Norwich	Public House/café		26 February 1976	TG2331008887; 52°37′54″N 1°17′54″E	1210774	The Louis Marchesi Public House More images
Tower and Adjoining Retaining Wall to Rear of No. 58, Bracondale	Norwich	Tower House	Pre 17th century	26 February 1954	TG2378407395; 52°37′05″N 1°18′16″E	1280541	Upload Photo
Undercroft beneath No. 3, Queen Street	Norwich	Undercroft	Medieval	5 June 1972	TG2327408694; 52°37′48″N 1°17′52″E	1291066	Upload Photo
War Memorial and War Memorial Garden Terrace	Norwich	War memorial	1927	30 September 1983	TG2291008511; 52°37′42″N 1°17′33″E	1051857	War Memorial and War Memorial Garden Terrace More images
Pulls Ferry	Norwich	Water Gate	15th century	26 February 1954	TG2389708758; 52°37′49″N 1°18′25″E	1206380	Pulls Ferry More images
11–15 Fye Bridge Street	Norwich	House	19th century	26 February 1954	TG2320509057; 52°38′00″N 1°17′49″E	1025094	11–15 Fye Bridge Street More images
No 1, The Close	Norwich	Office		26 February 1954	TG2339908751; 52°37′50″N 1°17′59″E	1051333	No 1, The Close More images
No 2, The Close	Norwich	House	1702	26 February 1954	TG2340708736; 52°37′49″N 1°17′59″E	1206337	No 2, The Close More images
Nos 3 & 4, The Close	Norwich	Barn	17th century	26 February 1954	TG2343608716; 52°37′49″N 1°18′01″E	1051334	Nos 3 & 4, The Close More images
No 5, The Close	Norwich	Barn	17th century	26 February 1954	TG2344808721; 52°37′49″N 1°18′01″E	1206349	No 5, The Close More images
No 6, The Close	Norwich	House	16th century	26 February 1954	TG2347308734; 52°37′49″N 1°18′03″E	1051335	No 6, The Close More images
No 7, The Close	Norwich	House	Late 18th century	26 February 1954	TG2354108768; 52°37′50″N 1°18′06″E	1051336	No 7, The Close More images
Nos 8 & 9, The Close	Norwich	House	Late 18th century	26 February 1954	TG2356208771; 52°37′50″N 1°18′08″E	1372760	Nos 8 & 9, The Close
Nos 10–12, The Close	Norwich	House	16th century	26 February 1954	TG2358608772; 52°37′50″N 1°18′09″E	1280248	Nos 10–12, The Close More images
No 14a, The Close	Norwich	House	17th century	5 June 1972	TG2362508742; 52°37′49″N 1°18′11″E	1051337	Upload Photo
No 16, The Close	Norwich	House	Pre 1850	26 February 1954	TG2367008752; 52°37′49″N 1°18′13″E	1206365	No 16, The Close
No 17, The Close	Norwich	House	1972	5 June 1972	TG2365808770; 52°37′50″N 1°18′13″E	1372761	No 17, The Close More images
No 18, The Close	Norwich	House	Late 18th century	5 June 1972	TG2367008770; 52°37′50″N 1°18′13″E	1206370	No 18, The Close More images
No 25, The Close	Norwich	House	1647	26 February 1954	TG2389308748; 52°37′49″N 1°18′25″E	1372762	Upload Photo
No 26, The Close	Norwich	House	Early 19th century	26 February 1954	TG2372508781; 52°37′50″N 1°18′16″E	1372763	No 26, The Close More images
No 27, The Close	Norwich	House		26 February 1954	TG2371408790; 52°37′51″N 1°18′16″E	1206385	No 27, The Close
No 28, The Close	Norwich	House		26 February 1954	TG2370708790; 52°37′51″N 1°18′15″E	1051341	No 28, The Close More images
No 29, The Close	Norwich	House	C16/C17	5 June 1972	TG2368408785; 52°37′51″N 1°18′14″E	1206389	No 29, The Close More images
No 30, The Close	Norwich	House		26 February 1954	TG2366908793; 52°37′51″N 1°18′13″E	1051301	No 30, The Close More images
No 31 The Close	Norwich	House		26 February 1954	TG2365308804; 52°37′51″N 1°18′12″E	1372782	No 31 The Close More images
Nos 32 & 33, The Close	Norwich	House	1682	26 February 1954	TG2364008802; 52°37′51″N 1°18′12″E	1051302	Nos 32 & 33, The Close More images
No 34, The Close	Norwich	Brewhouse	18th century	26 February 1954	TG2364008824; 52°37′52″N 1°18′12″E	1372783	No 34, The Close More images
Nos 35a, 35b and 35c, The Close	Norwich	Apartment	By 1972	5 June 1972	TG2367408854; 52°37′53″N 1°18′14″E	1051303	Nos 35a, 35b and 35c, The Close More images
No 36, The Close	Norwich	House	17th century	5 June 1972	TG2368008860; 52°37′53″N 1°18′14″E	1051304	No 36, The Close
Nos 37 and 38, The Close	Norwich	House	1633	5 June 1972	TG2369208863; 52°37′53″N 1°18′15″E	1372784	Nos 37 and 38, The Close More images
No 39, The Close	Norwich	House	17th century	5 June 1972	TG2369908864; 52°37′53″N 1°18′15″E	1051305	No 39, The Close
No 40, The Close	Norwich	House	17th century	26 February 1954	TG2370508877; 52°37′53″N 1°18′15″E	1372785	No 40, The Close More images
No 41, The Close	Norwich	House	Early 18th century	5 June 1972	TG2369508875; 52°37′53″N 1°18′15″E	1051306	No 41, The Close More images
Nos 43 & 44, The Close	Norwich	House	Late 17th century	26 February 1954	TG2366708981; 52°37′57″N 1°18′14″E	1051307	Upload Photo
No 45, The Close	Norwich	Bakery	Early 19th century	5 June 1972	TG2368008889; 52°37′54″N 1°18′14″E	1206406	No 45, The Close More images
No 46, The Close	Norwich	House	Early 19th century	26 February 1954	TG2367908872; 52°37′53″N 1°18′14″E	1372786	No 46, The Close More images
No 49, The Close	Norwich	House	C14/C15	26 February 1954	TG2366108863; 52°37′53″N 1°18′13″E	1051308	No 49, The Close More images
No 50, The Close	Norwich	House	17th century	26 February 1954	TG2364808856; 52°37′53″N 1°18′12″E	1206417	No 50, The Close More images
Nos 51–55, The Close	Norwich	House	15th century	26 February 1954	TG2360508847; 52°37′53″N 1°18′10″E	1051309	Nos 51–55, The Close More images
No 56, The Close	Norwich	House	16th century	26 February 1954	TG2357708846; 52°37′53″N 1°18′08″E	1051310	No 56, The Close More images
No 65, The Close	Norwich	House	16th century	5 June 1972	TG2348508794; 52°37′51″N 1°18′03″E	1372787	No 65, The Close More images
Nos 67a, 67b, 67c and 68, The Close	Norwich	Clergy House	15th century	26 February 1954	TG2344608801; 52°37′51″N 1°18′01″E	1206435	Nos 67a, 67b, 67c and 68, The Close More images
No 71, The Close	Norwich	House	Early 17th century	5 June 1972	TG2336608858; 52°37′53″N 1°17′57″E	1280207	No 71, The Close More images
No 73, The Close	Norwich	Office	Early 19th century	5 June 1972	TG2338708806; 52°37′52″N 1°17′58″E	1280208	No 73, The Close More images
71, Botolph Street	Norwich	Shop	C20	8 April 1986	TG2293909461; 52°38′13″N 1°17′36″E	1051372	Upload Photo
13–17 St Giles Street	Norwich	Shop	19th century	5 June 1972	TG2283408578; 52°37′45″N 1°17′28″E	1372482	13–17 St Giles Street More images
35, St Giles Street	Norwich	House	Late C16/Early 17th century	26 February 1954	TG2273908588; 52°37′46″N 1°17′23″E	1290649	Upload Photo
46, St Giles Street	Norwich	House	19th century	5 June 1972	TG2267808576; 52°37′45″N 1°17′20″E	1051841	Upload Photo
48, St Giles Street	Norwich	House	19th century	26 February 1954	TG2266408576; 52°37′45″N 1°17′19″E	1051842	Upload Photo
56–60, King Street	Norwich	Public House/Shops (Da Vinci hairdressers)	19th century	26 February 1954	TG2339208451; 52°37′40″N 1°17′58″E	1051240	56–60, King Street More images
91, King Street	Norwich	House	Late 15th century	5 June 1972	TG2345008336; 52°37′36″N 1°18′01″E	1051235	Upload Photo
125, 125a and 127, King Street	Norwich	Shop	C20	26 February 1954	TG2357308161; 52°37′31″N 1°18′07″E	1217899	Upload Photo
168, King Street	Norwich	House	C20	26 February 1954	TG2360908034; 52°37′26″N 1°18′08″E	1051205	Upload Photo
170 & 172, King Street	Norwich	House	17th century	26 February 1954	TG2361808020; 52°37′26″N 1°18′09″E	1051206	Upload Photo
9, Surrey Street	Norwich	House	1764	26 February 1954	TG2299808129; 52°37′30″N 1°17′36″E	1051830	Upload Photo
11 & 13, Elm Hill	Norwich	House	Early 18th century	8 April 1986	TG2320608829; 52°37′53″N 1°17′49″E	1298580	Upload Photo
28 & 30, Elm Hill	Norwich	Shop	C20	26 February 1954	TG2321508890; 52°37′55″N 1°17′49″E	1206720	28 & 30, Elm Hill More images
34 & 36, Elm Hill	Norwich	House (Flint and yellow rendering)		26 February 1954	TG2323108924; 52°37′56″N 1°17′50″E	1051270	34 & 36, Elm Hill More images
41 & 43, Elm Hill	Norwich	Courtyard House	Early 19th century	26 February 1954	TG2322908891; 52°37′55″N 1°17′50″E	1372805	41 & 43, Elm Hill More images
18, Colegate	Norwich	House	Early 18th century	26 February 1954	TG2311909031; 52°37′59″N 1°17′45″E	1372773	18, Colegate More images
20, Colegate	Norwich	House	Early 17th century	26 February 1954	TG2310109022; 52°37′59″N 1°17′44″E	1051283	20, Colegate More images
65 Pottergate	Norwich	House	C17	5 June 1972	TG2269008706; 52°37′49″N 1°17′21″E	1051938	Upload Photo
38 & 40 Bethel Street	Norwich	House	18th century	5 June 1972	TG2272508480; 52°37′42″N 1°17′22″E	1051399	38 & 40 Bethel Street More images
42–48, Bethel Street	Norwich	Wall	C20	8 April 1986	TG2270708489; 52°37′42″N 1°17′21″E	1372714	42–48, Bethel Street More images
2, Redwell Street	Norwich	Shop	19th century	8 April 1986	TG2321208702; 52°37′49″N 1°17′49″E	1051881	2, Redwell Street More images
7, Princes Street	Norwich	Office		26 February 1954	TG2317908766; 52°37′51″N 1°17′47″E	1220186	7, Princes Street More images
9, Princes Street	Norwich	Office		26 February 1954	TG2318608768; 52°37′51″N 1°17′48″E	1051913	9, Princes Street More images
20, Princes Street	Norwich	Restaurant	C20	26 February 1954	TG2327508829; 52°37′53″N 1°17′52″E	1051911	20, Princes Street More images
5, Bedford Street	Norwich	Shop	1972	5 June 1972	TG2302608655; 52°37′47″N 1°17′39″E	1205170	5, Bedford Street More images
15, Bedford Street	Norwich	Shop	16th century	5 June 1972	TG2305608654; 52°37′47″N 1°17′40″E	1051390	15, Bedford Street More images
52 & 54, Bishopgate	Norwich	House	17th century	5 June 1972	TG2387708984; 52°37′57″N 1°18′25″E	1205621	52 & 54, Bishopgate More images
4, Tombland	Norwich	House	18th century	26 February 1954	TG2331308784; 52°37′51″N 1°17′54″E	1290353	4, Tombland More images
5 & 5a, Tombland	Norwich	House	Mid 18th century	26 February 1954	TG2330908795; 52°37′51″N 1°17′54″E	1051808	5 & 5a, Tombland More images
8, Tombland	Norwich	House/Tombland Bookshop	Pre 18th century	5 June 1972	TG2333208825; 52°37′52″N 1°17′55″E	1210760	8, Tombland
1 and 3 Timberhill	Norwich	House	17th century	28 March 1972	TG2310308329; 52°37′37″N 1°17′42″E	1372475	1 and 3 Timberhill More images
2 Charing Cross	Norwich	Shop	C20	5 June 1972	TG2293008744; 52°37′50″N 1°17′34″E	1372734	Upload Photo
22 and 24 Lower Goat Lane	Norwich	Wall	C20	5 June 1972	TG2285508654; 52°37′47″N 1°17′30″E	1218739	Upload Photo
7 St Faith's Lane	Norwich	House	17th century	5 June 1972	TG2369108621; 52°37′45″N 1°18′14″E	1220856	7 St Faith's Lane
3 and 4 Haymarket	Norwich	House	18th century	26 February 1954	TG2299308414; 52°37′40″N 1°17′36″E	1209850	Upload Photo
6, 9 and 10 Ninham's Court	Norwich	House	16th century	5 June 1972	TG2259108522; 52°37′44″N 1°17′15″E	1051924	Upload Photo
2–9 Octagon Court	Norwich	Flats	C18	26 February 1954	TG2305509047; 52°38′00″N 1°17′41″E	1051929	Upload Photo
19–21, Bedford Street	Norwich	Shop	C20	15 October 1970	TG2307708661; 52°37′47″N 1°17′41″E	1372711	19–21, Bedford Street More images
27–30, Gentleman's Walk	Norwich	House	17th century	26 May 1954	TG2299608452; 52°37′41″N 1°17′37″E	1051245	27–30, Gentleman's Walk
24, Gentleman's Walk	Norwich	House	Mid 19th century	5 June 1972	TG2299308479; 52°37′42″N 1°17′37″E	1051244	Upload Photo
