= Norwich War Memorial =

First World War memorial in Norwich, England

- United Kingdom
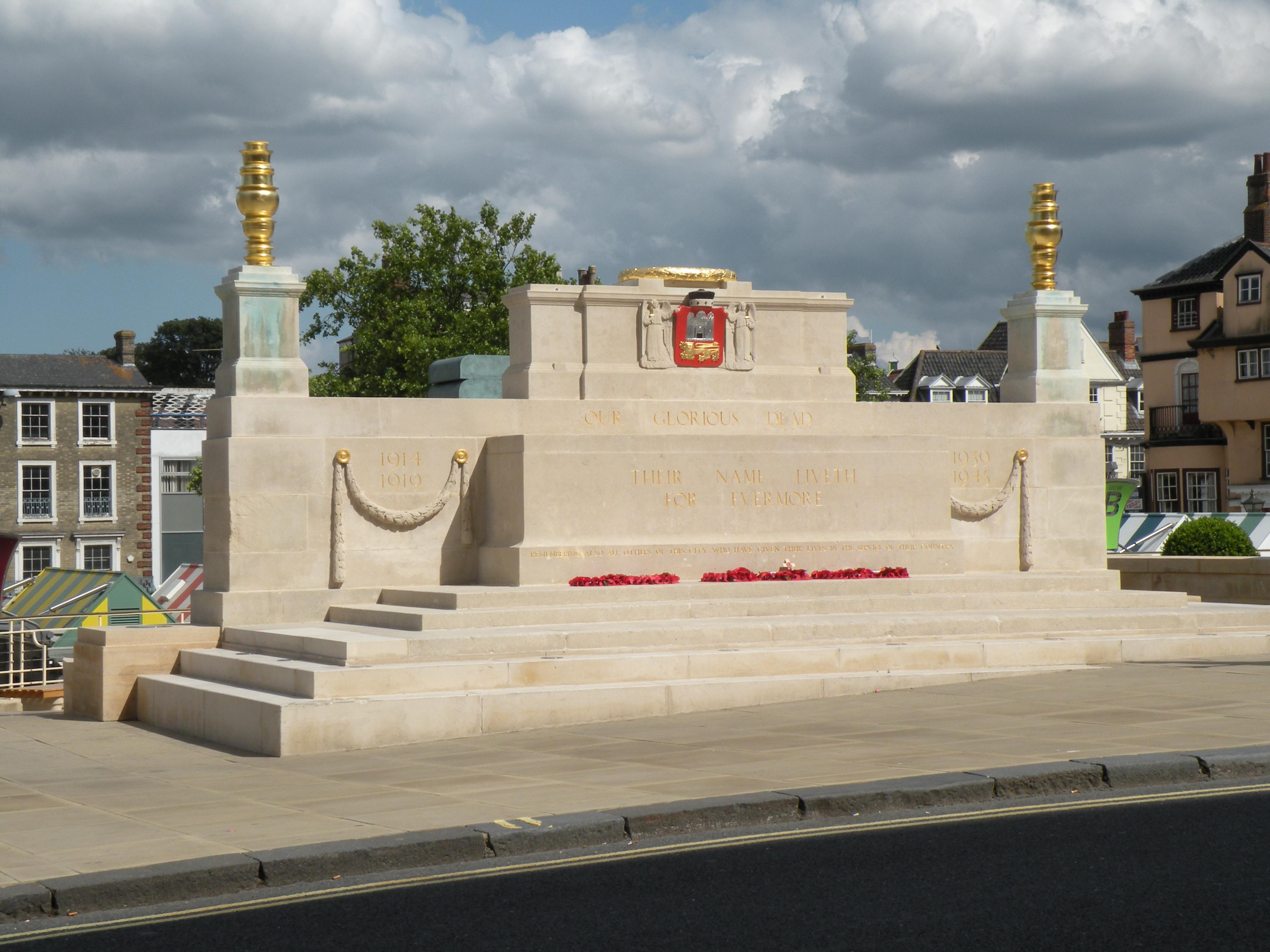
- For servicemen from Norwich killed in the First World War
- Unveiled: 1927
- Location: 52.62858°N 1.29234°E; Market Place, Norwich, Norfolk
- Designed by: Sir Edwin Lutyens
- OUR GLORIOUS DEAD / THEIR NAME LIVETH / FOR EVERMORE / REMEMBERING ALSO ALL OTHERS OF THIS CITY WHO HAVE GIVEN THEIR LIVES IN THE SERVICE OF THEIR COUNTRY

Listed Building – Grade II*
- Official name: War Memorial and War Memorial Garden Terrace
- Designated: 30 September 1983
- Reference no.: 1051857

Norwich War Memorial (also known as Norwich City War Memorial or Norwich Cenotaph) is a First World War memorial in Norwich in Eastern England. It was designed by Sir Edwin Lutyens, the last of his eight cenotaphs to be erected in England. Before Lutyens' involvement, several abandoned proposals had been made for commemorating Norwich's war dead, and by 1926 the newly elected lord mayor was determined to see the construction of a memorial before he left office. He established an appeal to raise funds for local hospitals in memory of the dead as well as a physical monument. He commissioned Lutyens, who designed an empty tomb (cenotaph) atop a low screen wall from which protrudes a Stone of Remembrance. Bronze flambeaux at either end can burn gas to emit a flame. Lutyens also designed a roll of honour, on which the names of the city's dead are listed, which was installed in Norwich Castle in 1931.

A local disabled veteran unveiled the memorial on 9 October 1927. It was moved from its original location to become the centrepiece of a memorial garden between the market and the City Hall in 1938. The structure on which the garden is built was found to be unstable in 2004 and the memorial was closed off pending repairs which began in 2008. The work was completed in 2011, during which time the memorial was restored, having fallen into disrepair while it was closed off, and rotated to face the city hall rather than the marketplace. It was rededicated on Armistice Day 2011 and is today a grade II* listed building. In 2015, it became part of a "national collection" of Lutyens' war memorials.

== Background ==
The Norfolk Regiment was one of the first to enter combat after the declaration of the First World War. The 1st battalion was stationed in Belfast, from where they were dispatched to France as part of the British Expeditionary Force. The 1st Norfolks participated at the Battle of Mons, one of the first major engagements of the war, in late August 1914. The 2nd battalion, based in India, sailed for the Middle East to fight against the Ottoman Empire in Mesopotamia (Iraq). The Norfolks had a third battalion, part of the Territorial Force, which was first deployed for home defence around eastern England, and raised three more pals battalions. Norwich, the county town, raised another three companies of Royal Engineers. Approximately 33,000 men served overseas with the Norfolks, though many more Norfolk men joined other regiments.

In the aftermath of the war and its unprecedented casualties, thousands of war memorials were built across Britain. Among the most prominent designers of memorials was Sir Edwin Lutyens, described by Historic England as "the leading English architect of his generation". Lutyens designed The Cenotaph on Whitehall in London, which became the focus for the national Remembrance Sunday commemorations; the Thiepval Memorial to the Missing, the largest British war memorial anywhere in the world; and the Stone of Remembrance, which appears in all large Commonwealth War Graves Commission cemeteries and in several of Lutyens' civic memorials, including Norwich's.

== Commissioning ==
Norwich was among the last of Lutyens' memorials to be built. Many towns and cities built memorials soon after the end of the First World War, but early attempts in Norwich proved abortive, each mired in controversy. A scheme to build an agricultural college to serve as a memorial reached the point of soliciting donations, but these had to be returned when the scheme was abandoned as being too ambitious and not appealing to all social classes. When Charles Bignold was elected Lord Mayor of Norwich in 1926, he was determined that the city would have a war memorial before he left office. He took the initiative and commissioned Lutyens and the two men selected a site to the east of the Guildhall when the architect visited the city on 13 June 1927. Adamant that the project should benefit the living as well as provide a monument to the dead, Bignold established the Joint Hospitals and War Memorial Appeal to raise funds for the Norfolk and Norwich Hospital and the Jenny Lind Children's Hospital, as well as a physical monument. The target was £35,000, of which £4,000 was to be allocated to a memorial. The memorial would not have space for the names of Norwich's 3,544 war dead, so Lutyens was also commissioned to design the Norwich Roll of Honour. A further £800–£1,000 was allocated and Lutyens produced a set of oak panels which fold out to reveal the names painted on the inside.

The monument was completed swiftly once the location was agreed; the total cost was £2,700 (1927), of which 10% was Lutyens' fee. The design and the proposed location continued to be a source of controversy in the local community. Some residents felt that the memorial would not be in keeping with the city's existing architecture, but Bignold felt sure that he had the backing of the ex-service community. He noted that the Guildhall was in a central location and as one of Norwich's most famous buildings was a significant attraction for visitors, and thus that siting the memorial there would display Norwich's pride in its contribution to the war. In response to criticisms of the design, he wrote that "the form of any war memorial depends entirely on the sum of money available for its construction. Knowing this sum, we consulted Sir Edwin Lutyens as to the best means of expending it. [...] We felt that all reasonable persons would be satisfied by the expert opinion of the man who gave London its Cenotaph".

== Design ==
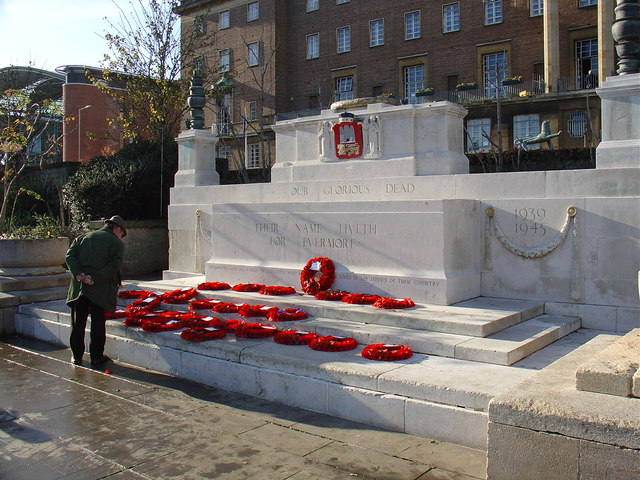
The memorial in 2004

The memorial is of Portland stone construction. It consists of a low screen wall on top of which is a tomb chest (cenotaph) topped with a carved wreath, the last of eight cenotaphs by Lutyens to be built in England—the first being Southampton's and the most famous being that on Whitehall in London. The city's coat of arms is carved and painted into the tomb, supported by two relief figures of angels. The memorial is flanked by pedestals, which are topped with bronze flambeaux (flaming torches) gilded with gold leaf. Protruding from the screen wall, beneath the coat of arms, is a Stone of Remembrance, the only one he designed to be integrated into a larger structure. Built into the structure were two metal caskets, one of which contained a list of Norwich's dead from the war and the contents of the second is unknown; the council decided that it would have been inappropriate to open it during restoration work.

The memorial is designed so that gas can be burnt inside it, with the smoke and flames emitted through the flambeaux at either end. Lutyens proposed similar designs for several memorials, including the Cenotaph on Whitehall, but Norwich was the only place where the proposal was accepted and is thus the only one of his memorials capable of emitting a flame. The inscriptions read OUR GLORIOUS DEAD (above the stone) and THEIR NAME LIVETH FOR EVERMORE (on the stone itself). A further inscription in smaller font on the base of the stone reads REMEMBERING ALSO ALL OTHERS OF THIS CITY WHO HAVE GIVEN THEIR LIVES IN THE SERVICE OF THEIR COUNTRY. This was added at a later date, along with the dates of the two world wars which are inscribed on the screen wall, either side of the stone.

The roll of honour was not completed as quickly. After a series of budget reductions, it was delivered in June 1929 but was of poor quality, and in the meantime the trustees of the castle museum had decided that the castle was not an appropriate place for the roll to be kept. It had also exceeded the reduced budget of £500, though Lutyens waived his fee and offered to pay the difference. The trustees changed their minds after improvements were made to the quality, and the roll of honour was installed in the castle on 13 January 1931 without ceremony as a result of embarrassment over the delay.

== History ==
General Sir Ian Hamilton presided over the memorial's unveiling on Sunday, 9 October 1927, at a ceremony attended by Lutyens. The unveiling itself was performed by a local veteran, Bertie Withers. Withers was selected at random after candidates were solicited from the city's ex-servicemen who met four criteria: that they were natives of Norwich; had enlisted prior to the implementation of conscription in 1916; had served overseas; and had been permanently disabled as a result of their service. Withers enlisted on 1 September 1914 and fought in the Gallipoli Campaign in 1915; after a bout of illness he rejoined his unit to fight in the First Battle of Gaza, where his battalion suffered heavy casualties. Withers himself was injured and, after his evacuation, his left leg was amputated below the knee. Upon his return to England he spent a year in the Norwich and Norfolk Hospital.

As part of civic redevelopment of the market area and surrounding buildings in 1938, the cenotaph was moved to a site on Market Place, between the new City Hall and the castle. There it formed the centrepiece of a dedicated memorial garden by C.H. James and S.R. Pierce. The garden was opened by King George VI on 29 October 1938. The whole monument now stands on a terrace which runs parallel to the city hall, sloping towards Market Place with steps accommodating the gradient. A row of eight ornamental lamp-posts stands along either side of the memorial itself, one of which is a later replacement. Two flagpoles stand at the corners, at the bases of which are low relief brass carvings of allegorical figures of Peace and Plenty.

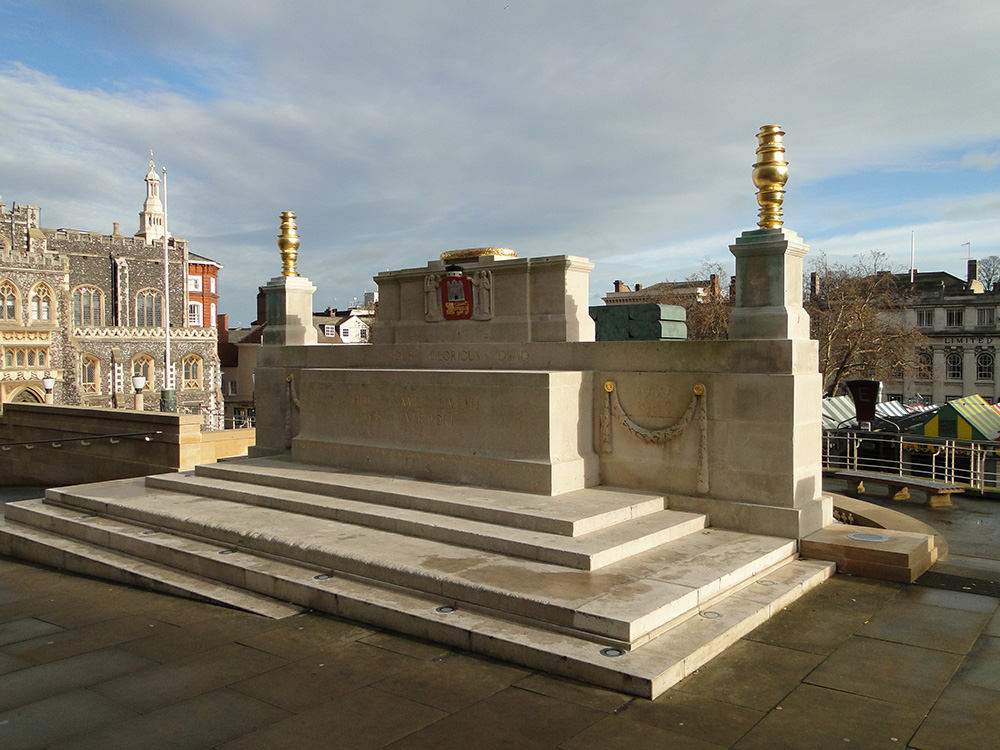
The memorial seen in 2011, following restoration work. It used to stand before the Norwich Guildhall which is the flint-faced building to the left

Structural problems with the undercroft of the garden were discovered in the early 21st century and the garden was closed and fenced off in 2004. The memorial remained fenced off for seven years and fell into disrepair as the city council lacked the funds to carry out the necessary repairs, though access was granted to representatives of the Royal British Legion to lay wreaths during Remembrance Sunday services. The journalist Martin Bell remarked on the condition of the memorial in 2007: "to find a war memorial in a state like that you would have to go to Iraq".

Repair work commenced on the garden and undercroft in early 2008—the beams and columns supporting the terrace having become dangerously weak—and was scheduled to take three years to complete. The council commissioned NPS Architectural Group to oversee restoration and work on the memorial itself started in September 2009; the council initially hoped that the project would be complete by Armistice Day 2010. During the repair work the memorial itself was rotated to face the city hall, in accordance with the wishes of local veterans to allow them easier access for parades, and underwent minor restoration work. Its place in the memorial garden was taken by a new bronze sculpture: Breath by Paul de Monchaux. The garden re-opened to the public in March 2011. The memorial and garden was re-dedicated after three years on Armistice Day, 11 November 2011; the repair work had cost £2.6 million.

The roll of honour suffered structural damage, and in 2016 was moved from the castle keep to the city hall. It was restored with the aid of grant funding from the War Memorials Trust and several local charities.

Two commemorative stones were laid in front of the memorial in August 2017 in honour of two men from Norwich who received the Victoria Cross (the highest award for gallantry in the British armed forces) in the First World War—Corporal Sidney James Day and Major Wilfred Edwards, who both earned their medals in August 1917. A third stone was planned to be laid in 2018 for Lance Corporal Ernest Seaman, the third and final Norwich-born recipient of the Victoria Cross, a century after the action for which he was decorated.

Norwich War Memorial was designated a Grade II listed building on 30 September 1983; it was upgraded to Grade II* in 2014. In November 2015, as part of commemorations for the centenary of the First World War, Historic England recognised it as part of a "national collection" of Lutyens' war memorials. At the same time, all 44 of his free-standing memorials in England were listed or had their listing status reviewed, and their National Heritage List for England list entries were updated and expanded.

== See also ==
- Grade II* listed buildings in Norwich
- Grade II* listed war memorials in England
