= Port of Norwich =

Small port on the River Wensum in Norwich, England

Coordinates: 52.633°N 1.296°E

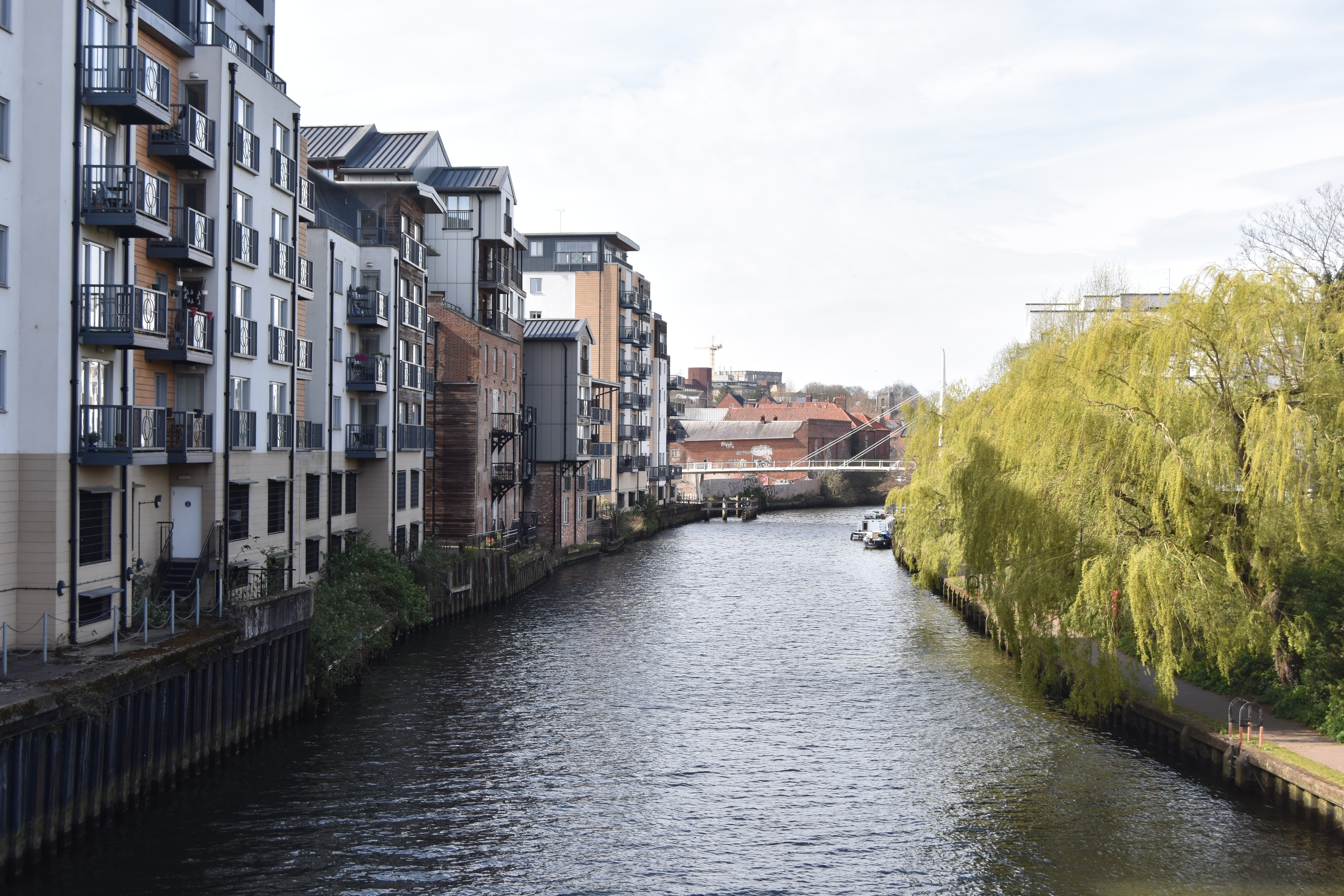
Picture upstream from the same location in 2022

The Port of Norwich is a small port on the River Wensum at Norwich, Norfolk. The use of the river as a port stretches back at least to medieval times, however its current standing as a port dates to an Act of Parliament on 28 May 1827.

The name Norwich comes from the Middle Saxon north wic meaning "north port" and there is evidence of urban settlement on the north bank from the tenth century. Norwich was likely founded as a port when the former Roman port of Venta Icenorum three miles to the south silted up.

The port was still in regular use in the 1960s and 1970s and continued to have some limited traffic in the 2010s. The port authority is Norwich City Council, who in 2012 stated that they consider the port defunct as a commercial port.
