= Listed buildings in Norwich (within the city walls, west of the Castle) =

Norwich is city and non-civil parish in Norfolk , England. It contains 62 grade I, 126 grade II* and 855 grade II listed buildings that are recorded in the National Heritage List for England.

This list is based on the information retrieved online from Historic England.

The concentration of listed buildings in Norwich necessitates subdivision into geographically defined lists. This list comprises all listed buildings situated within the city walls, to the west of Norwich Castle (including the Castle), and south of the River Wensum.

== Key ==
Grade	Criteria
I	Buildings that are of exceptional interest
II*	Particularly important buildings of more than special interest
II	Buildings that are of special interest

== Listing ==
Name	Grade	Location	Type	Completed (Note: The date given is the date used by Historic England as significant for the initial building or that of an important part in the structure's description.)	Date designated	Grid ref. (Note: The grid reference is based on the British national grid reference system, sometimes known as OSGB36, used by the Ordnance Survey.) Geo-coordinates	Notes	Entry number (Note: The "List Entry Number" is a unique number assigned to each listed building and scheduled monument by Historic England.)	Image	Wikidata
Ivory House	II	All Saints Green			5 June 1972	TG2302807935; 52°37′24″N 1°17′37″E		1051387	Ivory House	Q26303264
St Catherine's Close	II*	All Saints Green			26 February 1954	TG2307907956; 52°37′25″N 1°17′40″E		1051385	St Catherine's Close	Q17557161
Surrey Cottage	II	All Saints Green			5 June 1972	TG2315308062; 52°37′28″N 1°17′44″E		1051383	Upload Photo	Q26303261
10, All Saints Green	II	10, All Saints Green			5 June 1972	TG2311608194; 52°37′32″N 1°17′42″E		1051386	Upload Photo	Q26303263
12, All Saints Green	II	12, All Saints Green			25 February 1954	TG2311808183; 52°37′32″N 1°17′43″E		1372748	Upload Photo	Q26653824
14 and 16, All Saints Green	II	14 and 16, All Saints Green			26 February 1954	TG2312008172; 52°37′32″N 1°17′43″E		1280865	Upload Photo	Q26569955
33 and 35, All Saints Green	II	33 and 35, All Saints Green			26 February 1954	TG2314708090; 52°37′29″N 1°17′44″E		1372745	33 and 35, All Saints Green	Q26653821
37 and 39, All Saints Green	II	37 and 39, All Saints Green			5 June 1972	TG2314408078; 52°37′28″N 1°17′44″E		1051382	Upload Photo	Q26303260
41, All Saints Green	II	41, All Saints Green			26 February 1954	TG2313608056; 52°37′28″N 1°17′43″E		1372746	41, All Saints Green	Q26653822
43, All Saints Green	II	43, All Saints Green			26 February 1954	TG2312808041; 52°37′27″N 1°17′43″E		1051384	43, All Saints Green	Q26303262
45, All Saints Green	II	45, All Saints Green			26 February 1954	TG2312208032; 52°37′27″N 1°17′42″E		1372747	45, All Saints Green	Q26653823
50, All Saints Green	II	50, All Saints Green			9 May 2000	TG2305107986; 52°37′26″N 1°17′38″E		1380310	50, All Saints Green	Q26660518
Royal Arcade	II*	Back Of The Inns			5 June 1972	TG2302708474; 52°37′41″N 1°17′38″E		1205148	Royal Arcade	Q17557233
9, Back of the Inns	II	9, Back Of The Inns			5 June 1972	TG2307808457; 52°37′41″N 1°17′41″E		1372749	9, Back of the Inns	Q26653825
Old Post Office Yard Behind Number 19 to Right of Carriage Arch	II*	Bedford Street			15 October 1970	TG2307308670; 52°37′48″N 1°17′41″E		1205180	Upload Photo	Q17557245
5, Bedford Street	II*	5, Bedford Street			5 June 1972	TG2302608655; 52°37′47″N 1°17′39″E		1205170	5, Bedford Street	Q17557237
9 and 11, Bedford Street	II	9 and 11, Bedford Street			5 June 1972	TG2304208654; 52°37′47″N 1°17′40″E		1372750	9 and 11, Bedford Street	Q26653826
10, Bedford Street	II	10, Bedford Street			26 February 1954	TG2305108637; 52°37′47″N 1°17′40″E		1372712	10, Bedford Street	Q26653796
13, Bedford Street	II	13, Bedford Street			5 June 1972	TG2305008653; 52°37′47″N 1°17′40″E		1205174	13, Bedford Street	Q26500543
15, Bedford Street	II*	15, Bedford Street			5 June 1972	TG2305608654; 52°37′47″N 1°17′40″E		1051390	15, Bedford Street	Q17557169
16, Bedford Street	II	16, Bedford Street			5 June 1972	TG2308908646; 52°37′47″N 1°17′42″E		1205190	Upload Photo	Q26500555
17, Bedford Street	II	17, Bedford Street			5 June 1972	TG2306008653; 52°37′47″N 1°17′41″E		1205177	Upload Photo	Q26500545
18, Bedford Street	II	18, Bedford Street			5 June 1972	TG2309808646; 52°37′47″N 1°17′43″E		1051392	Upload Photo	Q26303268
19-21, Bedford Street	II*	19-21, Bedford Street			15 October 1970	TG2307708661; 52°37′47″N 1°17′41″E		1372711	19-21, Bedford Street	Q17531152
25, Bedford Street	II	25, Bedford Street			5 June 1972	TG2310408660; 52°37′47″N 1°17′43″E		1051391	Upload Photo	Q26303267
27, Bedford Street	II	27, Bedford Street			5 June 1972	TG2311408661; 52°37′47″N 1°17′43″E		1280852	Upload Photo	Q26569942
Bethel Hospital	II*	Bethel Street			8 April 1986	TG2272108455; 52°37′41″N 1°17′22″E		1051362	Bethel Hospital	Q17557143
City Hall Including Police Station	II*	Bethel Street			29 January 1971	TG2284408475; 52°37′42″N 1°17′29″E		1210484	Upload Photo	Q5123186
Rear of Number 38	II	Bethel Street			8 April 1986	TG2273608510; 52°37′43″N 1°17′23″E		1280772	Upload Photo	Q26569864
Rear of Number 48	II	Bethel Street			8 April 1986	TG2270908507; 52°37′43″N 1°17′22″E		1205360	Upload Photo	Q26500710
The Fire Station	II	Bethel Street			31 October 2008	TG2276808480; 52°37′42″N 1°17′25″E		1393193	Upload Photo	Q26672375
33, Bethel Street	II	33, Bethel Street			26 February 1954	TG2277008447; 52°37′41″N 1°17′25″E		1051361	Upload Photo	Q26303245
38 and 40, Bethel Street	II*	38 and 40, Bethel Street			5 June 1972	TG2272508480; 52°37′42″N 1°17′22″E		1051399	Upload Photo	Q17557171
42-48, Bethel Street	II*	42-48, Bethel Street			8 April 1986	TG2270708489; 52°37′42″N 1°17′21″E		1372714	Upload Photo	Q17531164
50 and 52, Bethel Street	II	50 and 52, Bethel Street			5 June 1972	TG2269308496; 52°37′43″N 1°17′21″E		1051400	Upload Photo	Q26303275
Coach and Horses	II	51, Bethel Street			5 June 1972	TG2267908480; 52°37′42″N 1°17′20″E		1372735	Upload Photo	Q26653812
York House	II	54, Bethel Street			5 June 1972	TG2268608500; 52°37′43″N 1°17′20″E		1205366	Upload Photo	Q26500715
59, Bethel Street	II	59, Bethel Street			26 February 1954	TG2263608521; 52°37′44″N 1°17′18″E		1051363	Upload Photo	Q26303246
Number 61 (includes Former Separate Item of Extension to Number 61)	II	61, Bethel Street			26 February 1954	TG2262308530; 52°37′44″N 1°17′17″E		1372736	Upload Photo	Q26653813
64, Bethel Street	II	64, Bethel Street			26 February 1954	TG2262308562; 52°37′45″N 1°17′17″E		1051401	Upload Photo	Q26303276
Turret Cottage	II	66, Bethel Street			5 June 1972	TG2261708561; 52°37′45″N 1°17′17″E		1372715	Upload Photo	Q26653798
67a, Bethel Street	II	67a, Bethel Street			26 February 1954	TG2260208544; 52°37′44″N 1°17′16″E		1051364	Upload Photo	Q26303247
69, Bethel Street	II	69, Bethel Street			5 June 1972	TG2259608549; 52°37′44″N 1°17′16″E		1051365	Upload Photo	Q26303248
Churchman House	I	71, Bethel Street			26 February 1954	TG2258008550; 52°37′45″N 1°17′15″E		1051844	Upload Photo	Q17537275
Bridewell Museum	I	Bridewell Alley			26 February 1954	TG2310908693; 52°37′48″N 1°17′43″E		1280532	Upload Photo	Q17537374
1 and 3, Bridewell Alley	II	1 and 3, Bridewell Alley			5 June 1972	TG2310108667; 52°37′48″N 1°17′43″E		1372767	Upload Photo	Q26653837
2, Bridewell Alley	II	2, Bridewell Alley			5 June 1972	TG2308808660; 52°37′47″N 1°17′42″E		1051348	Upload Photo	Q26303232
4, Bridewell Alley	II	4, Bridewell Alley			5 June 1972	TG2308908667; 52°37′48″N 1°17′42″E		1372768	Upload Photo	Q26653838
5, Bridewell Alley	II	5, Bridewell Alley			5 June 1972	TG2310008673; 52°37′48″N 1°17′43″E		1051347	Upload Photo	Q26303231
10 and 12, Bridewell Alley	II	10 and 12, Bridewell Alley			5 June 1972	TG2308708687; 52°37′48″N 1°17′42″E		1205844	Upload Photo	Q26501127
14-18, Bridewell Alley	II	14-18, Bridewell Alley			5 June 1972	TG2308608698; 52°37′49″N 1°17′42″E		1051349	Upload Photo	Q26303233
2 and 4, Brigg Street	II	2 and 4, Brigg Street			5 June 1972	TG2297408332; 52°37′37″N 1°17′35″E		1205883	Upload Photo	Q26501164
Bridge over Castle Moat and 2 Entrance Lodges, Including Cast Iron Gates And Railings	II	Castle Meadow			5 June 1972	TG2318608441; 52°37′40″N 1°17′47″E		1205063	Upload Photo	Q26500445
Norwich Castle	I	Castle Meadow			26 February 1954	TG2318708527; 52°37′43″N 1°17′47″E		1372724	Upload Photo	Q1672292
Railings to East of Lodges to Bridge over Castle Moat	II	Castle Meadow			8 April 1986	TG2320608441; 52°37′40″N 1°17′48″E		1051420	Upload Photo	Q26303295
Railings to the West of Lodges to Bridge over Castle Moat	II	Castle Meadow			8 April 1986	TG2316508438; 52°37′40″N 1°17′46″E		1051421	Upload Photo	Q26303297
5 and 6, Castle Meadow	II	5 and 6, Castle Meadow			5 June 1972	TG2308808465; 52°37′41″N 1°17′42″E		1280407	Upload Photo	Q26569546
12, Castle Meadow	II	12, Castle Meadow			5 June 1972	TG2309908570; 52°37′44″N 1°17′42″E		1051354	Upload Photo	Q26303238
13, Castle Meadow	II	13, Castle Meadow			5 June 1972	TG2310208577; 52°37′45″N 1°17′43″E		1206054	Upload Photo	Q26501316
20, Castle Meadow	II	20, Castle Meadow			4 May 1971	TG2314608611; 52°37′46″N 1°17′45″E		1051355	Upload Photo	Q26303239
23, Castle Meadow	II	23, Castle Meadow			5 June 1972	TG2316308615; 52°37′46″N 1°17′46″E		1051356	Upload Photo	Q26303240
Opie House	II	26, Castle Meadow			5 June 1972	TG2320208626; 52°37′46″N 1°17′48″E		1280412	Upload Photo	Q26569551
27, Castle Meadow	II	27, Castle Meadow			5 June 1972	TG2321008624; 52°37′46″N 1°17′48″E		1372731	Upload Photo	Q26653809
15, Chapelfield East	II	15, Chapelfield East			5 June 1972	TG2269408360; 52°37′38″N 1°17′20″E		1206071	Upload Photo	Q26501332
Boundary Wall and Gate Piers between Number 12 and St Mary's Croft	II	Chapelfield North			5 June 1972	TG2262508454; 52°37′41″N 1°17′17″E		1280361	Upload Photo	Q26569505
St Mary's Croft	II	Chapelfield North			5 June 1972	TG2263908452; 52°37′41″N 1°17′18″E		1051360	Upload Photo	Q26303244
3, Chapelfield North	II	3, Chapelfield North			5 June 1972	TG2252808496; 52°37′43″N 1°17′12″E		1051357	Upload Photo	Q26303241
4, Chapelfield North	II	4, Chapelfield North			26 February 1954	TG2253808492; 52°37′43″N 1°17′12″E		1280418	Upload Photo	Q26569557
5 and 6, Chapelfield North	II	5 and 6, Chapelfield North			5 June 1972	TG2254808489; 52°37′43″N 1°17′13″E		1372732	Upload Photo	Q26653810
7, Chapelfield North	II	7, Chapelfield North			5 June 1972	TG2255508487; 52°37′43″N 1°17′13″E		1206105	Upload Photo	Q26501366
8, Chapelfield North	II	8, Chapelfield North			5 June 1972	TG2256808482; 52°37′42″N 1°17′14″E		1051358	Upload Photo	Q26303242
9, Chapelfield North	II	9, Chapelfield North			5 June 1972	TG2257308481; 52°37′42″N 1°17′14″E		1051359	Upload Photo	Q26303243
10, Chapelfield North	II	10, Chapelfield North			5 June 1972	TG2257908479; 52°37′42″N 1°17′15″E		1280399	Upload Photo	Q26569538
12, Chapelfield North	II	12, Chapelfield North			5 June 1972	TG2261808462; 52°37′42″N 1°17′17″E		1372733	Upload Photo	Q26653811
Bollard Opposite Number 2	II	Charing Cross			5 June 1972	TG2293008749; 52°37′50″N 1°17′34″E		1372754	Upload Photo	Q26653830
2, Charing Cross	II*	2, Charing Cross			5 June 1972	TG2293008744; 52°37′50″N 1°17′34″E		1372734	Upload Photo	Q17531174
4, Charing Cross	II	4, Charing Cross			5 June 1972	TG2291708744; 52°37′50″N 1°17′33″E		1051322	Upload Photo	Q26303215
Strangers Hall Museum	I	6, Charing Cross			26 February 1954	TG2289208726; 52°37′50″N 1°17′32″E		1372755	Upload Photo	Q7621576
Anchor House	II	Coslany Square			5 June 1972	TG2277808833; 52°37′53″N 1°17′26″E		1206526	Upload Photo	Q26501732
6, Coslany Square	II	6, Coslany Square			5 June 1972	TG2281308843; 52°37′54″N 1°17′28″E		1372776	Upload Photo	Q26653845
St Miles Bridge	II	Coslany Street			5 June 1972	TG2278908861; 52°37′54″N 1°17′27″E		1051286	Upload Photo	Q26303193
1, Cow Hill	II	1, Cow Hill			5 June 1972	TG2252508587; 52°37′46″N 1°17′12″E		1206530	Upload Photo	Q26501736
2 and 3, Cow Hill	II	2 and 3, Cow Hill			26 February 1954	TG2252608600; 52°37′46″N 1°17′12″E		1051288	Upload Photo	Q26303195
Holkham House	II*	15-17, Cow Hill			26 February 1954	TG2253108686; 52°37′49″N 1°17′13″E		1206535	Upload Photo	Q17530830
18, Cow Hill	II	18, Cow Hill			5 June 1972	TG2253408696; 52°37′49″N 1°17′13″E		1051289	Upload Photo	Q26303196
3-5, Dove Street	II	3-5, Dove Street			8 April 1986	TG2295408595; 52°37′45″N 1°17′35″E		1051294	Upload Photo	Q26303201
29, Exchange Street	II	29, Exchange Street			5 June 1972	TG2300108663; 52°37′48″N 1°17′37″E		1025132	Upload Photo	Q26276083
The Black Swan	II	31, Exchange Street			5 June 1972	TG2300408678; 52°37′48″N 1°17′38″E		1051275	Upload Photo	Q26303185
33, Exchange Street	II	33, Exchange Street			5 June 1972	TG2300308687; 52°37′48″N 1°17′38″E		1025134	Upload Photo	Q26276085
34, Exchange Street	II	34, Exchange Street			8 April 1986	TG2299308711; 52°37′49″N 1°17′37″E		1355126	Upload Photo	Q26638006
35 and 37, Exchange Street	II	35 and 37, Exchange Street			5 June 1972	TG2301008702; 52°37′49″N 1°17′38″E		1051276	Upload Photo	Q26303186
36, Exchange Street	II	36, Exchange Street			8 April 1986	TG2299408719; 52°37′49″N 1°17′37″E		1051277	Upload Photo	Q26303187
39, Exchange Street	II	39, Exchange Street			5 June 1972	TG2301208711; 52°37′49″N 1°17′38″E		1355123	Upload Photo	Q26638003
41, Exchange Street	II	41, Exchange Street			5 June 1972	TG2301408720; 52°37′49″N 1°17′38″E		1372807	Upload Photo	Q26653864
Letterbox Adjacent to Number 12	II	Gentleman's Walk			5 June 1972	TG2298408558; 52°37′44″N 1°17′36″E		1051243	Upload Photo	Q26303156
16, Gentleman's Walk	II	16, Gentleman's Walk, NR2 1LZ			8 April 1986	TG2299608521; 52°37′43″N 1°17′37″E		1372791	Upload Photo	Q26653852
24 Gentleman's Walk, Non Civil Parish	II*	24, Gentleman's Walk			5 June 1972	TG2299308479; 52°37′42″N 1°17′37″E		1051244	Upload Photo	Q17557038
25, Gentleman's Walk	II	25, Gentleman's Walk			5 June 1972	TG2298908469; 52°37′41″N 1°17′36″E		1372792	Upload Photo	Q26653853
27-30, Gentleman's Walk	II*	27-30, Gentleman's Walk			26 May 1954	TG2299608452; 52°37′41″N 1°17′37″E		1051245	Upload Photo	Q17557042
31, Gentleman's Walk	II	31, Gentleman's Walk			8 April 1986	TG2296708449; 52°37′41″N 1°17′35″E		1051246	Upload Photo	Q26303157
34 and 35, Gentleman's Walk	II	34 and 35, Gentleman's Walk			26 February 1954	TG2295108460; 52°37′41″N 1°17′34″E		1051247	Upload Photo	Q26303158
37, Gentleman's Walk	II	37, Gentleman's Walk			26 February 1954	TG2294908467; 52°37′41″N 1°17′34″E		1025018	Upload Photo	Q26275861
The Guildhall	I	Guildhall Hill			26 February 1954	TG2292008560; 52°37′44″N 1°17′33″E		1187384	Upload Photo	Q7061502
1, Guildhall Hill	II	1, Guildhall Hill			26 February 1954	TG2288408595; 52°37′46″N 1°17′31″E		1187322	Upload Photo	Q26482538
Numbers 2 to 4 Including the Norfolk and Norwich Subscription Library	II	2-4, Guildhall Hill			5 June 1972	TG2291108612; 52°37′46″N 1°17′33″E		1372794	Upload Photo	Q26653855
6, 7, 8a and 9, Guildhall Hill	II	6, 7, 8a and 9, Guildhall Hill			26 February 1954	TG2296108578; 52°37′45″N 1°17′35″E		1298768	Upload Photo	Q26586221
8, Guildhall Hill	II	8, Guildhall Hill			26 February 1954	TG2296208599; 52°37′46″N 1°17′35″E		1051253	Upload Photo	Q26303164
Statue of Sir Thomas Browne	II	Hay Hill			5 June 1972	TG2294808389; 52°37′39″N 1°17′34″E		1051258	Upload Photo	Q26303169
3 and 4, Haymarket	II*	3 and 4, Haymarket			26 February 1954	TG2299308414; 52°37′40″N 1°17′36″E		1209850	Upload Photo	Q17530853
14, Haymarket	II	14, Haymarket			5 June 1972	TG2297808340; 52°37′37″N 1°17′35″E		1051256	Upload Photo	Q26303167
The St George and Dragon	II	18, Haymarket			5 June 1972	TG2294508360; 52°37′38″N 1°17′34″E		1209872	Upload Photo	Q26504920
19-21, Haymarket	II	19-21, Haymarket			5 June 1972	TG2296908416; 52°37′40″N 1°17′35″E		1372797	Upload Photo	Q26653857
22 and 22a, Haymarket	II	22 and 22a, Haymarket			5 June 1972	TG2296708430; 52°37′40″N 1°17′35″E		1051257	Upload Photo	Q26303168
23 and 24, Haymarket	II	23 and 24, Haymarket			5 June 1972	TG2296608439; 52°37′40″N 1°17′35″E		1209875	Upload Photo	Q26504924
2 and 4, Lion and Castle Yard	II	2 and 4, Lion And Castle Yard			5 June 1972	TG2311508269; 52°37′35″N 1°17′43″E		1372812	Upload Photo	Q26653868
1 and 2, Little Bethel Street	II	1 and 2, Little Bethel Street			5 June 1972	TG2269208473; 52°37′42″N 1°17′21″E		1218439	Upload Photo	Q26513068
1-5, London Street	II	1-5, London Street			5 June 1972	TG2299608584; 52°37′45″N 1°17′37″E		1051214	Upload Photo	Q26303130
7, London Street	II	7, London Street			5 June 1972	TG2300808584; 52°37′45″N 1°17′38″E		1218445	Upload Photo	Q26513072
9 and 11, London Street	II	9 and 11, London Street			5 June 1972	TG2301808585; 52°37′45″N 1°17′38″E		1372813	Upload Photo	Q26653869
27, London Street	II	27, London Street			8 April 1986	TG2307608600; 52°37′45″N 1°17′41″E		1051215	Upload Photo	Q26303131
28, London Street	II	28, London Street			5 June 1972	TG2308608573; 52°37′45″N 1°17′42″E		1372815	Upload Photo	Q26653871
29, London Street	II	29, London Street			5 June 1972	TG2308508603; 52°37′46″N 1°17′42″E		1218453	Upload Photo	Q26513079
30, London Street	II	30, London Street, NR2 1LD			5 June 1972	TG2309208583; 52°37′45″N 1°17′42″E		1291889	Upload Photo	Q26579959
31-35, London Street	II	31-35, London Street			5 June 1972	TG2309508615; 52°37′46″N 1°17′42″E		1051216	Upload Photo	Q26303132
32, London Street	II	32, London Street			5 June 1972	TG2309808590; 52°37′45″N 1°17′42″E		1051218	Upload Photo	Q26303134
37, London Street	II	37, London Street			5 June 1972	TG2310808623; 52°37′46″N 1°17′43″E		1218465	Upload Photo	Q26513090
39, London Street	II	39, London Street			5 June 1972	TG2311208629; 52°37′46″N 1°17′43″E		1372814	Upload Photo	Q26653870
41 and 43, London Street	II	41 and 43, London Street			5 June 1972	TG2311708632; 52°37′46″N 1°17′44″E		1218585	Upload Photo	Q26513207
National Westminster Bank	II	45-51, London Street			5 June 1972	TG2312008644; 52°37′47″N 1°17′44″E		1051217	Upload Photo	Q26303133
57, London Street	II	57, London Street			8 April 1986	TG2315508671; 52°37′48″N 1°17′46″E		1218600	Upload Photo	Q26513219
60 and 62, London Street	II	60 and 62, London Street			8 April 1986	TG2318808661; 52°37′47″N 1°17′47″E		1291893	Upload Photo	Q26579961
5 and 7, Lower Goat Lane	II	5 and 7, Lower Goat Lane			5 June 1972	TG2287908605; 52°37′46″N 1°17′31″E		1372816	Upload Photo	Q26653872
13, Lower Goat Lane	II	13, Lower Goat Lane			5 June 1972	TG2287408626; 52°37′47″N 1°17′31″E		1218634	Upload Photo	Q26513250
14 and 16, Lower Goat Lane	II	14 and 16, Lower Goat Lane			5 June 1972	TG2285808631; 52°37′47″N 1°17′30″E		1218662	Upload Photo	Q26513276
18 and 20, Lower Goat Lane	II	18 and 20, Lower Goat Lane			5 June 1972	TG2285508645; 52°37′47″N 1°17′30″E		1051220	Upload Photo	Q26303136
21, Lower Goat Lane	II	21, Lower Goat Lane			5 June 1972	TG2286608653; 52°37′47″N 1°17′30″E		1051219	Upload Photo	Q26303135
22 and 24, Lower Goat Lane	II*	22 and 24, Lower Goat Lane			5 June 1972	TG2285508654; 52°37′47″N 1°17′30″E		1218739	Upload Photo	Q17530926
Shire Hall Chambers	II	Market Avenue			5 June 1972	TG2325308508; 52°37′42″N 1°17′50″E		1219034	Upload Photo	Q26513607
Shire House	II	Market Avenue			5 June 1972	TG2325508546; 52°37′43″N 1°17′51″E		1372844	Upload Photo	Q26653896
1, Market Avenue	II	1, Market Avenue			5 June 1972	TG2321808329; 52°37′36″N 1°17′48″E		1372770	Upload Photo	Q26653840
6, 9 and 10, Ninham's Court	II*	6, 9 and 10, Ninham's Court			5 June 1972	TG2259108522; 52°37′44″N 1°17′15″E		1051924	Upload Photo	Q17557221
Castle Chambers	II	Opie Street			8 April 1986	TG2318908635; 52°37′46″N 1°17′47″E		1219602	Upload Photo	Q26514134
3, Opie Street	II	3, Opie Street			8 April 1986	TG2317908644; 52°37′47″N 1°17′47″E		1051931	Upload Photo	Q26303745
Bell Hotel	II	Orford Hill			26 February 1954	TG2311008373; 52°37′38″N 1°17′43″E		1051932	Upload Photo	Q26303746
6, Orford Hill	II	6, Orford Hill			8 April 1986	TG2311308345; 52°37′37″N 1°17′43″E		1219605	Upload Photo	Q26514137
8, Orford Hill	II	8, Orford Hill			26 February 1954	TG2309508329; 52°37′37″N 1°17′42″E		1051933	Upload Photo	Q26303747
Lamb Inn	II	Orford Place			5 June 1972	TG2302908362; 52°37′38″N 1°17′38″E		1051934	Upload Photo	Q26303748
7-13, Orford Place	II	7-13, Orford Place			8 April 1986	TG2302308342; 52°37′37″N 1°17′38″E		1219638	Upload Photo	Q26514169
Colman House	II	Pottergate			26 February 1954	TG2270708729; 52°37′50″N 1°17′22″E		1219739	Upload Photo	Q26514264
6, Pottergate	II	6, Pottergate			5 November 1970	TG2291908645; 52°37′47″N 1°17′33″E		1051900	Upload Photo	Q26303718
7, Pottergate	II	7, Pottergate			26 February 1954	TG2291408660; 52°37′48″N 1°17′33″E		1372440	Upload Photo	Q26653562
8 and 10, Pottergate	II	8 and 10, Pottergate			5 June 1972	TG2290908649; 52°37′47″N 1°17′33″E		1372461	Upload Photo	Q26653581
Bagleys House, Bagley's Court (to The Rear Of Numbers 8 and 10 Pottergate)	II	Pottergate			5 June 1972	TG2290908628; 52°37′47″N 1°17′32″E		1051901	Upload Photo	Q26303719
11, Pottergate	II	11, Pottergate			5 June 1972	TG2290208663; 52°37′48″N 1°17′32″E		1051936	Upload Photo	Q26303750
13a and 15, Pottergate	II	13a and 15, Pottergate			5 June 1972	TG2289308665; 52°37′48″N 1°17′32″E		1291339	Upload Photo	Q26579464
17-21, Pottergate	II	17-21, Pottergate			26 February 1954	TG2287308671; 52°37′48″N 1°17′31″E		1051937	Upload Photo	Q26303751
18, Pottergate	II	18, Pottergate			5 June 1972	TG2285408664; 52°37′48″N 1°17′30″E		1051902	Upload Photo	Q26303720
20, Pottergate	II	20, Pottergate			5 June 1972	TG2284008664; 52°37′48″N 1°17′29″E		1372462	Upload Photo	Q26653582
24, Pottergate	II	24, Pottergate			5 June 1972	TG2281508671; 52°37′48″N 1°17′28″E		1051903	Upload Photo	Q26303721
26, Pottergate	II	26, Pottergate			5 June 1972	TG2279808671; 52°37′48″N 1°17′27″E		1372463	Upload Photo	Q26653583
52, Pottergate	II	52, Pottergate			5 June 1972	TG2268908690; 52°37′49″N 1°17′21″E		1051904	Upload Photo	Q26303722
56 and 58, Pottergate	II	56 and 58, Pottergate			5 June 1972	TG2267208692; 52°37′49″N 1°17′20″E		1051905	Upload Photo	Q26303723
59, Pottergate	II	59, Pottergate			5 June 1972	TG2272208701; 52°37′49″N 1°17′23″E		1219726	Upload Photo	Q26514252
61 and 63, Pottergate	II	61 and 63, Pottergate			26 February 1954	TG2271308702; 52°37′49″N 1°17′22″E		1372441	Upload Photo	Q26653563
65, Pottergate	II*	65, Pottergate			5 June 1972	TG2269008706; 52°37′49″N 1°17′21″E		1051938	Upload Photo	Q17557228
69 and 71, Pottergate	II	69 and 71, Pottergate			16 April 1980	TG2266708708; 52°37′50″N 1°17′20″E		1291325	Upload Photo	Q26579451
76, Pottergate	II	76, Pottergate			5 June 1972	TG2258708700; 52°37′49″N 1°17′16″E		1219971	Upload Photo	Q26514473
83 and 85, Pottergate	II	83 and 85, Pottergate			5 June 1972	TG2261608713; 52°37′50″N 1°17′17″E		1372442	Upload Photo	Q26653564
89, Pottergate	II	89, Pottergate			5 June 1972	TG2258308712; 52°37′50″N 1°17′15″E		1219799	Upload Photo	Q26514316
91, Pottergate	II	91, Pottergate			5 June 1972	TG2257208713; 52°37′50″N 1°17′15″E		1051939	Upload Photo	Q26303752
Micawber's Tavern	II	92, Pottergate			5 June 1972	TG2256308703; 52°37′50″N 1°17′14″E		1051906	Upload Photo	Q26303724
93, Pottergate	II	93, Pottergate			5 June 1972	TG2256108716; 52°37′50″N 1°17′14″E		1219823	Upload Photo	Q26514339
95, Pottergate	II	95, Pottergate			26 February 1954	TG2254908721; 52°37′50″N 1°17′14″E		1051940	Upload Photo	Q26303753
97, Pottergate	II	97, Pottergate			5 June 1972	TG2252908723; 52°37′50″N 1°17′13″E		1372460	Upload Photo	Q26653580
98, Pottergate	II	98, Pottergate			26 February 1954	TG2252008686; 52°37′49″N 1°17′12″E		1051907	Upload Photo	Q26303725
100-104, Pottergate	II	100-104, Pottergate			26 February 1954	TG2250408706; 52°37′50″N 1°17′11″E		1220007	Upload Photo	Q26514507
Church of St Stephen	I	Rampant Horse Street			26 February 1954	TG2292108294; 52°37′36″N 1°17′32″E		1051920	Upload Photo	Q17537310
11, Red Lion Street	II	11, Red Lion Street			5 June 1972	TG2306408280; 52°37′35″N 1°17′40″E		1051882	Upload Photo	Q26303704
13, Red Lion Street	II	13, Red Lion Street			10 January 1996	TG2306508288; 52°37′35″N 1°17′40″E		1245291	Upload Photo	Q26537844
3, Rigby's Court	II	3, Rigby's Court			5 June 1972	TG2263108562; 52°37′45″N 1°17′18″E		1372490	Upload Photo	Q26653606
4, Rigby's Court	II	4, Rigby's Court			5 June 1972	TG2264008567; 52°37′45″N 1°17′18″E		1051883	Upload Photo	Q26303705
1 and 1a, St Andrew's Hill	II	1 and 1a, St Andrew's Hill			5 June 1972	TG2314608664; 52°37′47″N 1°17′45″E		1051888	Upload Photo	Q26303710
4 and 6, St Andrew's Hill	II	4 and 6, St Andrew's Hill			5 June 1972	TG2313408672; 52°37′48″N 1°17′45″E		1291009	Upload Photo	Q26579167
8, St Andrew's Hill	II	8, St Andrew's Hill			26 February 1954	TG2313308678; 52°37′48″N 1°17′45″E		1372491	Upload Photo	Q26653607
10, St Andrew's Hill	II	10, St Andrew's Hill			5 June 1972	TG2313208689; 52°37′48″N 1°17′44″E		1290976	Upload Photo	Q26579138
12, St Andrew's Hill	II	12, St Andrew's Hill			26 February 1954	TG2313008696; 52°37′48″N 1°17′44″E		1051889	Upload Photo	Q26303711
The Halls	I	St Andrew's Plain, NR3 1AU			26 February 1954	TG2314108814; 52°37′52″N 1°17′45″E		1220456	Upload Photo	Q7586881
A Pair of K6 Telephone Kiosks Outside St Andrew's Church	II	St Andrew's Street			1 September 1987	TG2312008738; 52°37′50″N 1°17′44″E		1372539	Upload Photo	Q26653649
Church of St Andrew	I	St Andrew's Street			26 February 1954	TG2310908716; 52°37′49″N 1°17′43″E		1051891	Upload Photo	Q17537298
Cinema City	I	St Andrew's Street			26 May 1954	TG2315008732; 52°37′50″N 1°17′46″E		1220477	Upload Photo	Q7061476
General Post Office Museum	II*	St Andrew's Street			21 September 1970	TG2306208713; 52°37′49″N 1°17′41″E		1051892	Upload Photo	Q17557208
2 and 4, St Andrew's Street	II	2 and 4, St Andrew's Street			5 June 1972	TG2296008740; 52°37′50″N 1°17′35″E		1372493	Upload Photo	Q26653608
14, St Andrew's Street	II	14, St Andrew's Street			5 June 1972	TG2301508733; 52°37′50″N 1°17′38″E		1220488	Upload Photo	Q26514958
23-27, St Andrew's Street	II	23-27, St Andrew's Street			26 February 1954	TG2306208754; 52°37′50″N 1°17′41″E		1220435	Upload Photo	Q26514910
37, St Andrew's Street	II	37, St Andrew's Street			5 June 1972	TG2309908757; 52°37′50″N 1°17′43″E		1051890	Upload Photo	Q26303712
39, St Andrew's Street	II*	39, St Andrew's Street			5 June 1972	TG2311308756; 52°37′50″N 1°17′44″E		1372492	Upload Photo	Q17531127
Church of St Lawrence	I	St Benedict's Street			26 February 1954	TG2275108784; 52°37′52″N 1°17′24″E		1372459	Upload Photo	Q7593934
Remains of St Benedict's Church	I	St Benedict's Street			26 February 1954	TG2247908777; 52°37′52″N 1°17′10″E		1051867	Upload Photo	Q17537283
St Margaret's Church	I	St Benedict's Street			25 February 1954	TG2265708812; 52°37′53″N 1°17′20″E		1051898	Upload Photo	Q17537303
4, St Benedict's Street	II	4, St Benedict's Street			16 September 1987	TG2280708743; 52°37′50″N 1°17′27″E		1372540	Upload Photo	Q26653650
14 and 16, St Benedict's Street	II	14 and 16, St Benedict's Street			16 September 1987	TG2276608747; 52°37′51″N 1°17′25″E		1051765	Upload Photo	Q26303605
18, 20 and 20a, St Benedict's Street	II	18, 20 and 20a, St Benedict's Street			8 April 1986	TG2274908749; 52°37′51″N 1°17′24″E		1051860	Upload Photo	Q26303686
26, St Benedict's Street	II	26, St Benedict's Street			5 June 1972	TG2273108752; 52°37′51″N 1°17′23″E		1051861	Upload Photo	Q26303687
28, St Benedict's Street	II	28, St Benedict's Street			5 June 1972	TG2272208755; 52°37′51″N 1°17′23″E		1372479	Upload Photo	Q26653597
34, St Benedict's Street	II	34, St Benedict's Street			8 April 1986	TG2269508760; 52°37′51″N 1°17′21″E		1051862	Upload Photo	Q26303688
45 and 47, St Benedict's Street	II	45 and 47, St Benedict's Street			5 June 1972	TG2260808804; 52°37′53″N 1°17′17″E		1220653	Upload Photo	Q26515114
49, St Benedict's Street	II	49, St Benedict's Street			26 February 1954	TG2260108808; 52°37′53″N 1°17′17″E		1051899	Upload Photo	Q26303717
Norwich Arts Centre	I	51, St Benedict's Street, NR2 4PG			26 February 1954	TG2258808832; 52°37′54″N 1°17′16″E		1220682	Upload Photo	Q7061470
The Plough Inn	II	58, St Benedict's Street			26 February 1954	TG2261208780; 52°37′52″N 1°17′17″E		1051863	Upload Photo	Q26303689
59 and 61, St Benedict's Street	II	59 and 61, St Benedict's Street			5 June 1972	TG2253808827; 52°37′54″N 1°17′13″E		1051859	Upload Photo	Q26303684
63, St Benedict's Street	II	63, St Benedict's Street			5 June 1972	TG2252708832; 52°37′54″N 1°17′13″E		1372478	Upload Photo	Q26653596
70, St Benedict's Street	II	70, St Benedict's Street			5 June 1972	TG2258608792; 52°37′52″N 1°17′16″E		1051864	Upload Photo	Q26303690
72, St Benedict's Street	II	72, St Benedict's Street			8 April 1986	TG2258208794; 52°37′52″N 1°17′16″E		1051865	Upload Photo	Q26303691
74 and 76, St Benedict's Street	II	74 and 76, St Benedict's Street			5 June 1972	TG2257408796; 52°37′53″N 1°17′15″E		1051866	Upload Photo	Q26303692
86, St Benedict's Street	II	86, St Benedict's Street			5 June 1972	TG2253608804; 52°37′53″N 1°17′13″E		1220785	Upload Photo	Q26515232
Blackfriar's Bridge	II	St George's Street			26 February 1954	TG2306508882; 52°37′55″N 1°17′41″E		1372480	Upload Photo	Q26653598
Festival House Annexe	II	6, St George's Street			5 June 1972	TG2311008765; 52°37′51″N 1°17′43″E		1372481	Upload Photo	Q26653599
Red Lion Public House	II	18, St George's Street			5 June 1972	TG2309708796; 52°37′52″N 1°17′43″E		1221009	Red Lion Public House More images	Q26515440
Rear of Number 31	II	St Giles Street			8 April 1986	TG2275508592; 52°37′46″N 1°17′24″E		1372483	Upload Photo	Q26653600
7, St Giles Street	II	7, St Giles Street			8 April 1986	TG2285408582; 52°37′45″N 1°17′29″E		1290700	Upload Photo	Q26578883
13-17, St Giles Street	II*	13-17, St Giles Street			5 June 1972	TG2283408578; 52°37′45″N 1°17′28″E		1372482	Upload Photo	Q17531103
19, St Giles Street	II	19, St Giles Street			5 June 1972	TG2282408578; 52°37′45″N 1°17′28″E		1051871	Upload Photo	Q26303696
21 and 21a, St Giles Street	II	21 and 21a, St Giles Street			5 June 1972	TG2281608578; 52°37′45″N 1°17′27″E		1221083	Upload Photo	Q26515506
28, St Giles Street	II	28, St Giles Street			5 June 1972	TG2278308562; 52°37′45″N 1°17′26″E		1051878	Upload Photo	Q26303702
29, St Giles Street	II	29, St Giles Street			5 June 1972	TG2276308588; 52°37′46″N 1°17′25″E		1051872	Upload Photo	Q26303697
30 and 32, St Giles Street	II	30 and 32, St Giles Street			5 June 1972	TG2277008564; 52°37′45″N 1°17′25″E		1372487	Upload Photo	Q26653603
31 and 33, St Giles Street	II	31 and 33, St Giles Street			26 February 1954	TG2275008587; 52°37′45″N 1°17′24″E		1221087	Upload Photo	Q26515510
34, St Giles Street	II	34, St Giles Street			5 June 1972	TG2274708566; 52°37′45″N 1°17′24″E		1290627	Upload Photo	Q26578814
35, St Giles Street	II*	35, St Giles Street			26 February 1954	TG2273908588; 52°37′46″N 1°17′23″E		1290649	Upload Photo	Q17531040
36, St Giles Street	II	36, St Giles Street			5 June 1972	TG2273208566; 52°37′45″N 1°17′23″E		1372505	Upload Photo	Q26653620
37, St Giles Street	II	37, St Giles Street			26 February 1954	TG2273108589; 52°37′46″N 1°17′23″E		1051873	Upload Photo	Q26303698
38, St Giles Street	II	38, St Giles Street, NR2 1LL			5 June 1972	TG2272208568; 52°37′45″N 1°17′22″E		1051839	Upload Photo	Q26303670
39, St Giles Street	II	39, St Giles Street			26 February 1954	TG2272208591; 52°37′46″N 1°17′22″E		1290651	Upload Photo	Q26578836
40, St Giles Street	II	40, St Giles Street			5 June 1972	TG2271108570; 52°37′45″N 1°17′22″E		1051840	Upload Photo	Q26303671
41-43, St Giles Street	II*	41-43, St Giles Street, NR2 1JR			5 June 1972	TG2270308593; 52°37′46″N 1°17′21″E		1372484	Upload Photo	Q17531115
42 and 44, St Giles Street	II	42 and 44, St Giles Street			26 February 1954	TG2269308571; 52°37′45″N 1°17′21″E		1372506	Upload Photo	Q26653621
45, St Giles Street	II	45, St Giles Street, NR2 1JR			31 July 1970	TG2268808595; 52°37′46″N 1°17′21″E		1221104	Upload Photo	Q26515524
46, St Giles Street	II*	46, St Giles Street			5 June 1972	TG2267808576; 52°37′45″N 1°17′20″E		1051841	Upload Photo	Q17557192
Former Masonic Hall	II	47, St Giles Street, NR2 1JR			5 June 1972	TG2267208598; 52°37′46″N 1°17′20″E		1051874	Upload Photo	Q26303699
48, St Giles Street	II*	48, St Giles Street			26 February 1954	TG2266408576; 52°37′45″N 1°17′19″E		1051842	Upload Photo	Q17557196
49, St Giles Street	II	49, St Giles Street, NR2 1JR			5 June 1972	TG2265808600; 52°37′46″N 1°17′19″E		1051875	Upload Photo	Q26303700
50 and 52, St Giles Street	II	50 and 52, St Giles Street			5 June 1972	TG2264208581; 52°37′45″N 1°17′18″E		1051843	Upload Photo	Q26303672
51, St Giles Street	II	51, St Giles Street			5 June 1972	TG2264508600; 52°37′46″N 1°17′18″E		1221107	Upload Photo	Q26515527
53, St Giles Street	II	53, St Giles Street			5 June 1972	TG2263508601; 52°37′46″N 1°17′18″E		1372485	Upload Photo	Q26653601
55, St Giles Street	II	55, St Giles Street			5 June 1972	TG2261508603; 52°37′46″N 1°17′17″E		1221108	Upload Photo	Q26515528
1-5, St Giles Terrace	II	1-5, St Giles Terrace			5 June 1972	TG2269408531; 52°37′44″N 1°17′21″E		1051848	Upload Photo	Q26303676
6a and 7, St Gregorys Alley	II	6a and 7, St Gregorys Alley			1 December 2009	TG2282008712; 52°37′49″N 1°17′28″E		1393546	Upload Photo	Q26672703
K6 Telephone Kiosk Outside St Gregory's Church	II	St Gregory's Alley			13 August 1990	TG2282708740; 52°37′50″N 1°17′28″E		1051768	Upload Photo	Q26303608
St Gregory's Church	I	St Gregory's Alley			26 February 1954	TG2284508711; 52°37′49″N 1°17′29″E		1210298	Upload Photo	Q17537355
4, 5 and 6, St Gregory's Alley	II	4, 5 and 6, St Gregory's Alley			20 August 1991	TG2282208702; 52°37′49″N 1°17′28″E		1372508	Upload Photo	Q26653623
Water Pump Opposite Number 20	II	St John Maddermarket			5 June 1972	TG2293808725; 52°37′50″N 1°17′34″E		1210417	Upload Photo	Q26505468
Maddermarket Theatre	II	6, St John's Alley			26 February 1954	TG2291008705; 52°37′49″N 1°17′33″E		1051849	Upload Photo	Q1925491
7, St John's Alley	II	7, St John's Alley			26 February 1954	TG2292908720; 52°37′50″N 1°17′34″E		1290499	Upload Photo	Q26578700
20, St John Maddermarket	II	20, St John Maddermarket			26 February 1954	TG2292908728; 52°37′50″N 1°17′34″E		1372510	Upload Photo	Q26653624
Building Rear Numbers 3 and 5	II	St John's Maddermarket			23 March 1972	TG2296408663; 52°37′48″N 1°17′35″E		1290503	Upload Photo	Q26578704
Church of St John the Baptist	I	St John's Maddermarket			26 February 1954	TG2293608666; 52°37′48″N 1°17′34″E		1372509	Upload Photo	Q5117440
Ironmonger's Arms	II	1, St John's Maddermarket			5 June 1972	TG2295508654; 52°37′47″N 1°17′35″E		1051850	Upload Photo	Q26303677
21 and 23, St John Maddermarket	II	21 and 23, St John Maddermarket			26 February 1954	TG2295108732; 52°37′50″N 1°17′35″E		1051851	Upload Photo	Q26303679
22, St John Maddermarket	II	22, St John Maddermarket			5 June 1972	TG2293008736; 52°37′50″N 1°17′34″E		1210422	Upload Photo	Q26505473
9, St Maragret's Street	II	9, St Maragret's Street			8 April 1986	TG2264208859; 52°37′54″N 1°17′19″E		1290459	Upload Photo	Q26578663
Church of St Peter Mancroft	I	St Peter's Street			26 February 1954	TG2293208426; 52°37′40″N 1°17′33″E		1210490	Upload Photo	Q7595351
War Memorial and War Memorial Garden Terrace	II*	St Peter's Street			30 September 1983	TG2291008511; 52°37′43″N 1°17′32″E		1051857	Upload Photo	Q22666899
The Thatched Cottage	II	St Swithin's Alley			26 February 1954	TG2259508867; 52°37′55″N 1°17′16″E		1051827	Upload Photo	Q26303662
Convent of Notre Dame	II	Surrey Street			26 February 1954	TG2331007847; 52°37′21″N 1°17′52″E		1210566	Upload Photo	Q26505616
Forecourt Wall	II	Railings And Gate Piers To Numbers 15-17, Surrey Street			8 April 1986	TG2302908100; 52°37′29″N 1°17′38″E		1210575	Upload Photo	Q26505625
Forecourt Wall and Balustrade to Norwich Union Offices	II	Surrey Street			8 April 1986	TG2302808137; 52°37′31″N 1°17′38″E		1372498	Upload Photo	Q26653613
Surrey House	II	Surrey Street			5 June 1972	TG2321507908; 52°37′23″N 1°17′47″E		1051829	Upload Photo	Q26303663
Norwich Union Offices	I	8, Surrey Street			5 June 1972	TG2304808147; 52°37′31″N 1°17′39″E		1210553	Upload Photo	Q7646820
9, Surrey Street	II*	9, Surrey Street			26 February 1954	TG2299808129; 52°37′30″N 1°17′36″E		1051830	Upload Photo	Q17557189
Forecourt Railings to Number 9	II	9, Surrey Street			8 April 1986	TG2301308139; 52°37′31″N 1°17′37″E		1210572	Upload Photo	Q26505623
15-17, Surrey Street	II	15-17, Surrey Street			26 February 1954	TG2301408082; 52°37′29″N 1°17′37″E		1372499	Upload Photo	Q26653614
29-35, Surrey Street	II	29-35, Surrey Street			26 February 1954	TG2306808015; 52°37′27″N 1°17′39″E		1051831	Upload Photo	Q26303664
1, Swan Lane	II	1, Swan Lane			5 June 1972	TG2308508612; 52°37′46″N 1°17′42″E		1210619	Upload Photo	Q26505666
2, Swan Lane	II	2, Swan Lane			5 June 1972	TG2307308616; 52°37′46″N 1°17′41″E		1372502	Upload Photo	Q26653617
8, Swan Lane	II	8, Swan Lane			8 April 1986	TG2307108634; 52°37′47″N 1°17′41″E		1290373	Upload Photo	Q26578581
2 Ten Bell Lane, Norwich	II	2, Ten Bell Lane, NR2 1HE			5 June 1972	TG2254908731; 52°37′50″N 1°17′14″E		1051835	Upload Photo	Q26303668
The Assembly House	I	Theatre Street, NR2 1RQ			26 February 1954	TG2280608299; 52°37′36″N 1°17′26″E		1051836	Upload Photo	Q4808666
Baptist Chapel	II	Timberhill			26 February 1954	TG2311308301; 52°37′36″N 1°17′43″E		1051799	Upload Photo	Q26303636
Church of St John Baptist	I	Timberhill			28 March 1972	TG2318608258; 52°37′34″N 1°17′46″E		1290337	Upload Photo	Q17537384
1 and 3, Timberhill	II*	1 and 3, Timberhill			28 March 1972	TG2310308329; 52°37′37″N 1°17′42″E		1372475	Upload Photo	Q17531089
2 and 4, Timberhill	II	2 and 4, Timberhill			28 March 1972	TG2311808336; 52°37′37″N 1°17′43″E		1372504	Upload Photo	Q26653619
5 and 7, Timberhill	II	5 and 7, Timberhill			28 March 1972	TG2310808322; 52°37′36″N 1°17′42″E		1210698	Upload Photo	Q26505743
6 and 8, Timberhill	II	6 and 8, Timberhill			28 March 1972	TG2312108327; 52°37′37″N 1°17′43″E		1210675	Upload Photo	Q26505721
9, Timberhill	II	9, Timberhill			28 March 1972	TG2310908313; 52°37′36″N 1°17′42″E		1051838	Upload Photo	Q26303669
17, Timberhill	II	17, Timberhill			28 March 1972	TG2311808291; 52°37′35″N 1°17′43″E		1051800	Upload Photo	Q26303637
19, Timberhill	II	19, Timberhill			28 March 1972	TG2312008287; 52°37′35″N 1°17′43″E		1051801	Upload Photo	Q26303638
21, Timberhill	II	21, Timberhill			28 March 1972	TG2312108282; 52°37′35″N 1°17′43″E		1051802	Upload Photo	Q26303639
23, Timberhill	II	23, Timberhill			28 March 1972	TG2312308277; 52°37′35″N 1°17′43″E		1051803	Upload Photo	Q26303640
25, Timberhill	II	25, Timberhill			28 March 1972	TG2312508273; 52°37′35″N 1°17′43″E		1051804	Upload Photo	Q26303641
31, Timberhill	II	31, Timberhill			28 March 1972	TG2313608254; 52°37′34″N 1°17′44″E		1372523	Upload Photo	Q26653634
33, Timberhill	II	33, Timberhill			26 February 1954	TG2314308245; 52°37′34″N 1°17′44″E		1051805	Upload Photo	Q26303642
35, Timberhill	II	35, Timberhill			28 March 1972	TG2315208242; 52°37′34″N 1°17′44″E		1051806	Upload Photo	Q26303643
41 and 43, Timberhill	II	41 and 43, Timberhill			28 March 1972	TG2317008229; 52°37′33″N 1°17′45″E		1372524	Upload Photo	Q26653635
Friends Meeting House	II*	Upper Goat Lane			26 February 1954	TG2280208656; 52°37′48″N 1°17′27″E		1051780	Upload Photo	Q17557175
Church of St Giles	I	Upper St Giles Street			26 February 1954	TG2256508599; 52°37′46″N 1°17′14″E		1051876	Upload Photo	Q17537290
74, Upper St Giles Street	II	74, Upper St Giles Street			26 February 1954	TG2253508563; 52°37′45″N 1°17′12″E		1051845	Upload Photo	Q26303673
75, Upper St Giles Street, Non Civil Parish	II	75, Upper St Giles Street			5 June 1972	TG2252408580; 52°37′46″N 1°17′12″E		1221167	Upload Photo	Q26515583
76 and 76a, Upper St Giles Street, Non Civil Parish	II	76 and 76a, Upper St Giles Street			5 June 1972	TG2252208564; 52°37′45″N 1°17′12″E		1051846	Upload Photo	Q26303674
77 and 79, Upper St Giles Street, Non Civil Parish	II	77 and 79, Upper St Giles Street			5 June 1972	TG2251308583; 52°37′46″N 1°17′11″E		1372486	Upload Photo	Q26653602
82, Upper St Giles Street, Non Civil Parish	II	82, Upper St Giles Street			5 June 1972	TG2249708566; 52°37′45″N 1°17′10″E		1372507	Upload Photo	Q26653622
84-88, Upper St Giles Street, Non Civil Parish	II	84-88, Upper St Giles Street			5 June 1972	TG2248608566; 52°37′45″N 1°17′10″E		1210264	Upload Photo	Q26505310
90, Upper St Giles Street, Non Civil Parish	II	90, Upper St Giles Street			5 June 1972	TG2247308565; 52°37′45″N 1°17′09″E		1051847	Upload Photo	Q26303675
91, Upper St Giles Street, Non Civil Parish	II	91, Upper St Giles Street			5 June 1972	TG2247208588; 52°37′46″N 1°17′09″E		1290611	Upload Photo	Q26578798
92 and 94, Upper St Giles Street, Non Civil Parish	II	92 and 94, Upper St Giles Street			26 February 1954	TG2245308564; 52°37′45″N 1°17′08″E		1210279	Upload Photo	Q26505326
95 and 95a, Upper St Giles Street, Non Civil Parish	II	95 and 95a, Upper St Giles Street			8 April 1986	TG2245608588; 52°37′46″N 1°17′08″E		1051877	Upload Photo	Q26303701
97, Upper St Giles Street, Non Civil Parish	II	97, Upper St Giles Street			5 June 1972	TG2244508587; 52°37′46″N 1°17′08″E		1221195	Upload Photo	Q26515607
Walnut Tree Shades	II	Old Post Office Court			8 April 1986	TG2303208526; 52°37′43″N 1°17′39″E		1104309	Upload Photo	Q26398288
K6 Telephone Kiosk Outside St Peter Mancroft Church	II	Weavers Lane			1 September 1987	TG2295708451; 52°37′41″N 1°17′35″E		1051764	Upload Photo	Q26303604
All Saints Church	I	Westlegate			26 February 1954	TG2314408229; 52°37′33″N 1°17′44″E		1051797	Upload Photo	Q17537267
20, Westlegate	II	20, Westlegate			26 February 1954	TG2311708235; 52°37′34″N 1°17′43″E		1051796	Upload Photo	Q26303635
Borrow House	II	Willow Lane			5 June 1972	TG2257908674; 52°37′49″N 1°17′15″E		1372519	Upload Photo	Q26653631
Former Catholic School	II	Willow Lane			5 June 1972	TG2262608648; 52°37′48″N 1°17′18″E		1051793	Upload Photo	Q26303632
1, Willow Lane	II	1, Willow Lane			5 June 1972	TG2262808610; 52°37′46″N 1°17′18″E		1372518	Upload Photo	Q26653630
2, Willow Lane	II	2, Willow Lane			5 June 1972	TG2262008604; 52°37′46″N 1°17′17″E		1211143	Upload Photo	Q26506175
4-14, Willow Lane	II	4-14, Willow Lane			26 February 1954	TG2258708633; 52°37′47″N 1°17′15″E		1051795	Upload Photo	Q26303634
Willow Lane House	II	9, Willow Lane			5 June 1972	TG2259308649; 52°37′48″N 1°17′16″E		1211121	Upload Photo	Q26506152
11 and 13, Willow Lane	II	11 and 13, Willow Lane			5 June 1972	TG2258108653; 52°37′48″N 1°17′15″E		1051794	Upload Photo	Q26303633
15, Willow Lane	II	15, Willow Lane			5 June 1972	TG2257408658; 52°37′48″N 1°17′15″E		1290157	Upload Photo	Q26578389
16, Willow Lane	II	16, Willow Lane			5 June 1972	TG2256008646; 52°37′48″N 1°17′14″E		1290164	Upload Photo	Q26578395
18, Willow Lane	II	18, Willow Lane			26 February 1954	TG2254908659; 52°37′48″N 1°17′13″E		1372520	Upload Photo	Q26653632
The Fruiterer's Arms	II	2 and 4, White Lion Street			5 June 1972	TG2300808442; 52°37′40″N 1°17′37″E		1372522	Upload Photo	Q26653633
20, White Lion Street	II	20, White Lion Street			5 June 1972	TG2307708406; 52°37′39″N 1°17′41″E		1051792	Upload Photo	Q26303631
22, 22a and 24, White Lion Street	II	22, 22a and 24, White Lion Street			8 April 1986	TG2307708391; 52°37′39″N 1°17′41″E		1211116	Upload Photo	Q26506147

== See also ==
- Grade I listed buildings in Norfolk
- Grade II* listed buildings in Norfolk

== Sources ==
- Wilson, Bill; Pevsner, Nikolaus (1997) [1962], Norfolk 1: Norwich and North-East, The Buildings of England, New Haven and London: Yale University Press, ISBN 978-0-300-09607-1
