= Bethel Hospital, Norwich =

Former psychiatric hospital in Norwich, England

Bethel Hospital
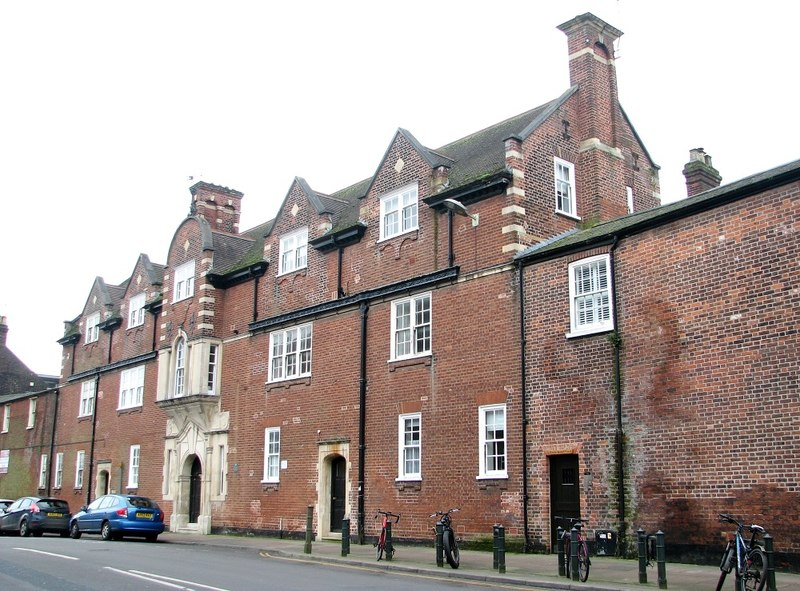

Geography
- Location: Bethel Street, Norwich, England
- Coordinates: 52.62798°N 1.28955°E

Organisation
- Care system: NHS
- Religious affiliation: Anglicanism, Quakers

Services
- Emergency department: No

History
- Founded: 1713
- Closed: 1995

Links
- Lists: Hospitals in England

Bethel Hospital is a former hospital and Grade II* listed building in Norwich, England. Opened in 1713 on Committee Street (now Bethel Street), it began as the first purpose-built lunatic asylum in Britain. It became part of the National Health Service and thus an annexe to Hellesdon Hospital in 1948, and in 1974 became an outpatient unit for children needing psychiatric treatment before closing by 1995.

== Background ==
The building sits on the former site of Committee House, a symbol of Parliament's power over the city during the English Civil Wars and the site of the Great Blow, the largest explosion recorded in 17th century England, when 98 barrels of gunpowder in its stores were accidentally detonated during a pro-royalist riot. Committee House was reduced to ruins, though was restored because the explosion had prevented its owner Sir Roger Townshend from obtaining his £28 per annum rent for it from the Committee of Norfolk; twelve workmen including masons, carpenters and labourers were employed to repair it, rebuilding a wall, its roof, and its gates as well as a timber store. These works were completed by the end of May, costing £83 and 3d. This remained occupied until 1687 but had decayed by 1696, as seen by the empty space shown on Thomas Cleer's map of the city that year.

Bethel Hospital was to be founded by Mary Chapman, daughter of John Mann who was one of the richest and most influential men in 17th century Norwich, and part of a leading Whig family. She married older Anglican cleric Samuel Chapman, incumbent of Thorpe Episcopi, in 1682. They had the idea of the hospital due to their shared experience of family members with psychiatric problems; Mary had taken from this a sense of gratitude to God for the safety of her own mind, as well as compassion. Samuel died after 18 years of marriage to Mary, before their plans came to fruition. Despite this, the couple had previously discussed providing a charity; her will states that he chose the name for Bethel Hospital. Mary survived her husband by 24 years, with no children.

== History ==
=== 1713–24: Founding and ownership by Mary Chapman ===
On 17 December 1712, the City Committee granted a lease to four men who acted as trustees on behalf of Mary, granting land on a thousand-year lease at peppercorn rent, "for the building a House or Houses for the benefit and use of such Persons as are Lunatics". Mary opened the hospital in 1713, setting it up as the first purpose-built lunatic asylum in the country. The foundation stone reads:

This house was built for the benefit of distrest Lunaticks Ano Dom. 1713 and is not to be alienated or employed to any other use or purpose whatsoever. Tis also requir'd that the Master, who shall be chosen from time to time, be a Man that lives in the Fear of God and sets up the true protestant Religion in his Family and will have a due Regard as well to the souls as bodies as those that are under his care.

Care given to the hospital's patents usually involved protection against "exploitation, self-injury or assault". In October 1719, one Henry Harston was in charge of the house; he died during the next four years and was succeeded by Robert Waller. Both Harston and Waller appear to be laymen who lacked any medical qualifications.

=== 1724–1948: Public trust, incorporation and expansion ===
Mary Chapman died on 8 January 1724; her will dictated that the hospital should become an independent public trust managed by a committee of 7 trustees, and that it would serve those with lunacy of a more recent onset, rather than those with congenital idiocy, and particularly the poor, with the aim of facilitating recovery. Thus, the hospital was administered as a public charity from this year onward. The first records of administrative organisation of the hospital and medical staff begin at this time.

For the first decades of the trust, almost half the trustees held high office for the Whig party, and trustees John Hall and William Cockman both previously served as Mayor of Norwich. There were around 25 residents in the hospital in 1743; at the time, its inventory included handcuffs, padlocks and two chairs and staples. Until 1750, residents numbered between 20 and 30, though increased to almost 50 by 1760, a change which is not reflected in Norwich's population change. In 1758, the hospital ordered 3 strait-waistcoats for "disorderly lunatics". Records for over 800 of the 1300 patients at the Bethel between 1760 and 1880 suggest that a third were pronounced cured or relieved. In 1765, it gained incorporation and its trustees became governors, experiencing a significant surplus of income above costs during this period, though my March 1766 the hospital restricted admissions to those from Norwich, Norfolk and Suffolk due to a lack of vacancies and by the 1780s it began to shrink in size and in income. This was possibly due to an increase in charity patients, which constituted half of the resident patients by the 1790s. In 1783, the length of stay at the hospital was restricted to 2 years.

Eight more beds were added in 1791, and patient numbers doubled from 31 in 1793 to 65 in 1806, with non-paying residents dropping to 20% from 40% in that time period. It was decided in 1806 to enlarge the hospital to officially admit 40 patients despite its actual patient numbers being already overcrowded at over 60 at the time. Over the first half of the 19th century, the average patient stay for those who died in the hospital was 14 years. By the end of the first century of the trust in 1824, the committee's members were largely being drawn from new manufacturing and banking families including the Gurney family, with more religious connections to Quakers than the Anglicans a century prior.

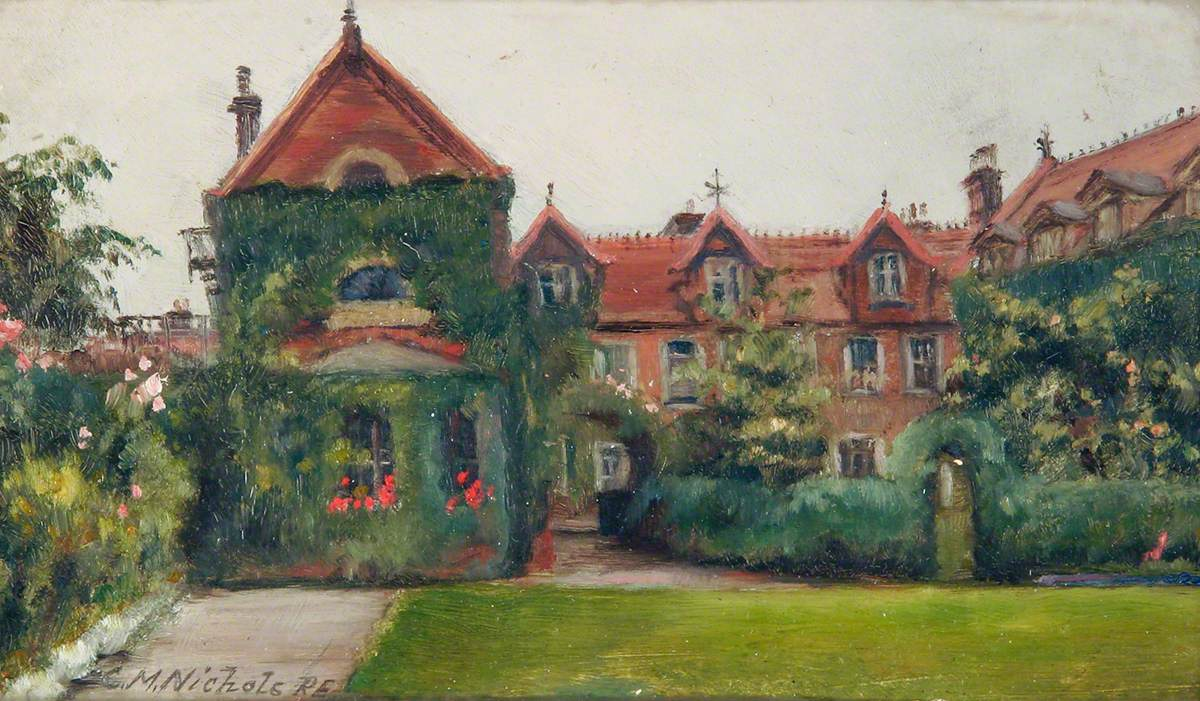
Painting of Bethel Hospital by Catherine Maude Nichols (1847–1923)

In 1875, the hospital had 70 patients, and in 1931 it had 128.

=== 1948–95: National Health Service and closure ===
In 1948, the National Health Service began, and Bethel Hospital became an annex to Hellesdon Hospital in the city. It became an outpatient unit for children needing psychiatric treatment in 1974, and it was closed by 1995; discussions went underway for a conversion of the building.

== Architecture ==
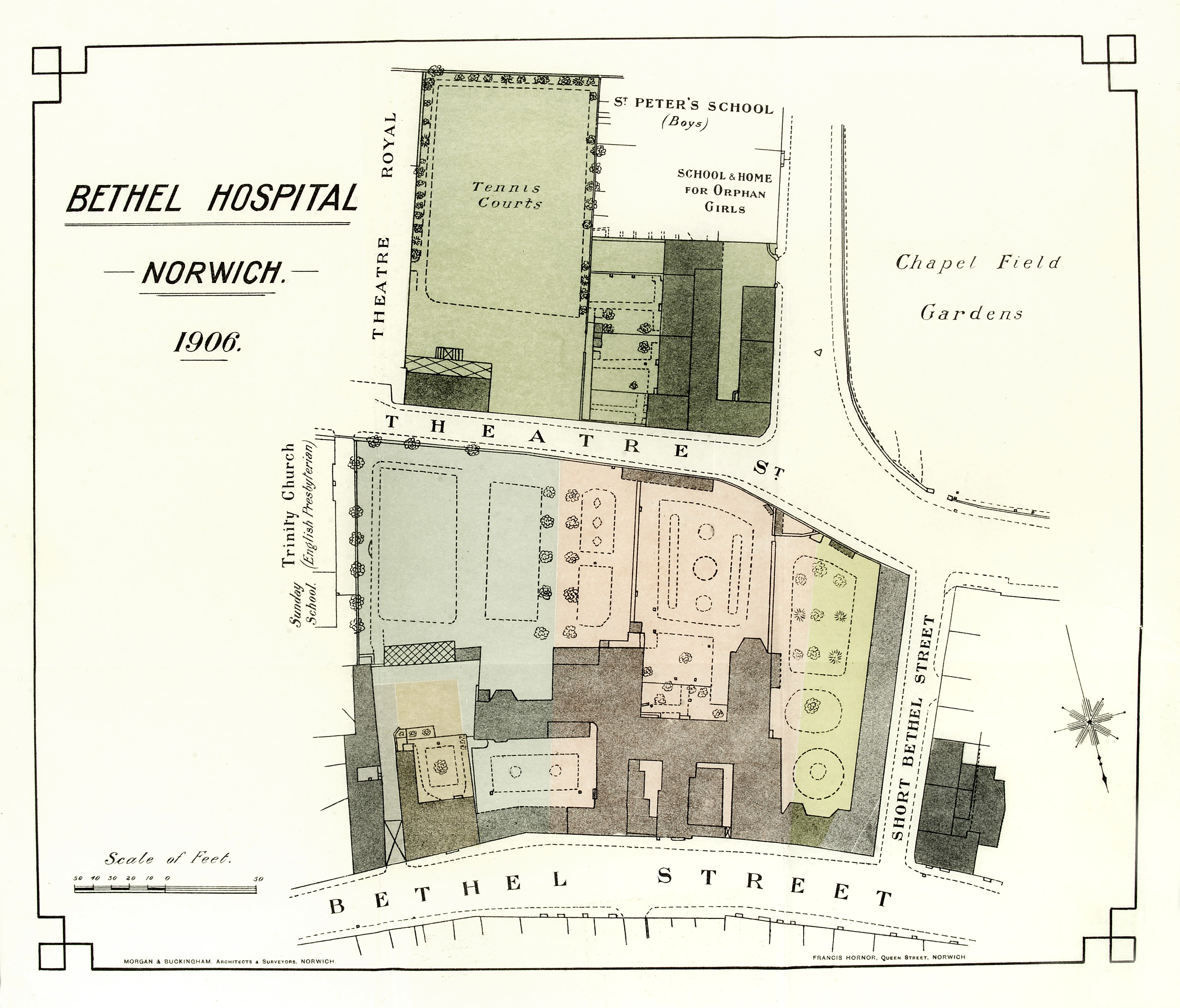
Map of the hospital in 1906, with Chapelfield Gardens to the south-west

One of the four trustees for Mary, John Morse, undertook management of the building of the hospital, though it was designed by an unknown architect. Carpenter Richard Starling and mason Edward Freeman constructed the building for 314 pounds, 2 shillings and 6 pennies. It was opened in 1713 with two wings and two stories.

As early as 1727, six new wards were commissioned, as well as other building work. Further expansion took place in the late 1740s and 1750s, including splitting the hospital into men's and women's sides in 1747, as well as a conversion in 1749 of a bathroom and strawroom into a cell and "Cellar for the worst of the Lunatics to be put in", respectively, while building a new strawhouse, bathroom and wash-house. In 1750 another bathroom was converted into a cell. A new committee room was completed in the mid-1750s Some alterations took place in 1807, and in 1899 architect Edward Boardman remodelled the front of the building facing Bethel Street.
