= Chapelfield Gardens =

Public park in Norwich, England

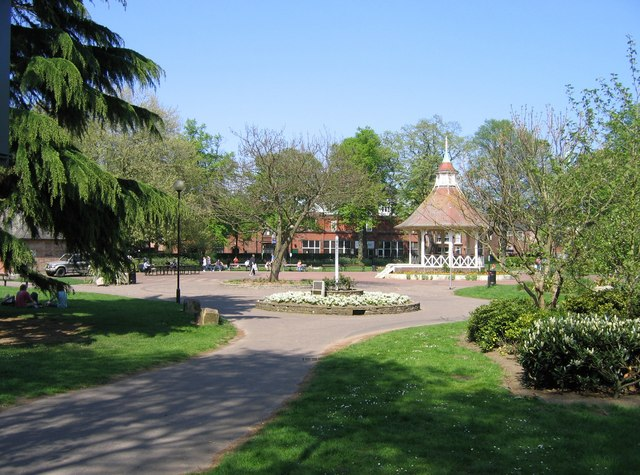
- Interactive map of Chapelfield Gardens
- Type: Public
- Location: Norwich
- OS grid: TG 22583 08375
- Coordinates: 52.6273°N 1.2873°E
- Authorized: 1655
- Designer: Sir Thomas Churchman
- Administrator: Norwich City Council

Chapelfield Gardens is a public park in Norwich. It is the earliest surviving ornamental public open space in the city, and a Grade II listed park. It is triangular in shape and features a bandstand.

Initially the site of a section of the Norwich city walls from around 1253, the name of the land now known as Chapelfield Gardens was derived from the chapel of St Mary in the Fields formerly in the area. The land was claimed by the citizens of Norwich in 1406. After the destruction of the chapel due to the dissolution of the monasteries in 1545, the land was granted to a private citizen, though was sold to the city and held in a trust from 1569. It was subject to mixed use over the early modern period, including for military training as well as morning exercise for ladies and gentlemen of leisure. Crowds mustered in the field prior to the Great Blow riot of 1648.

By 1655, citizens were given the right to walk on the land for recreation at all times. The land had developed into Norwich's earliest pleasure garden and an entertainment district for the wealthy by the end of the 17th century, with the nearby Chapel Field House being integrated into its layout. The grounds were further developed over the 18th century, adding fences, a theatre and bowling green, and walks with avenues of trees. At the end of the 18th century, its central area was leased to the Waterworks Company which added a reservoir and water tower. This grew over time, and the public were redirected to Castle Ditches as a new public park in response to expressed annoyance.

The Waterworks Company gave up their lease in 1852, and the city laid out the land as a public garden which opened on 17 April that year. Further developments ensued, including a drill hall, an iron palisade, the flattening of the area, a 40-ton iron pagoda designed by Thomas Jeckyll and made by Barnard, Bishop & Barnards for the 1876 Philadelphia Exhibition, the present polygonal bandstand, a refreshment pavilion, and a children's play area. During World War II, Chapelfield Gardens was home to military structures including a barrage balloon site and underground shelters. The pagoda was damaged by bombing and demolished in 1949, and the construction of the nearby Grapes Hill roundabout cut off a corner of the gardens in the 1970s. In the present day, the park is home to sculptures and artwork and central for events including Norwich Pride.

== Description ==
The gardens are triangular, and are bordered on their north side by the Chapel Field North road, and Chapel Field East on the east, with the dual carriageway Chapel Field Road on the south-west. Ruins of Norwich's city wall survive along this side of the gardens. There are four pedestrian entrances; three at each corner and a fourth at the Chapel Field Road side via a subway under the inner ring road.

In the gardens are a timber bandstand 70m from the north-east corner entrance, as well as a brick and tile refreshment shelter 30m to the north-west of the bandstand and a refreshment pavilion in the north-west corner.

== History ==
=== City walls and St Mary in the Fields ===
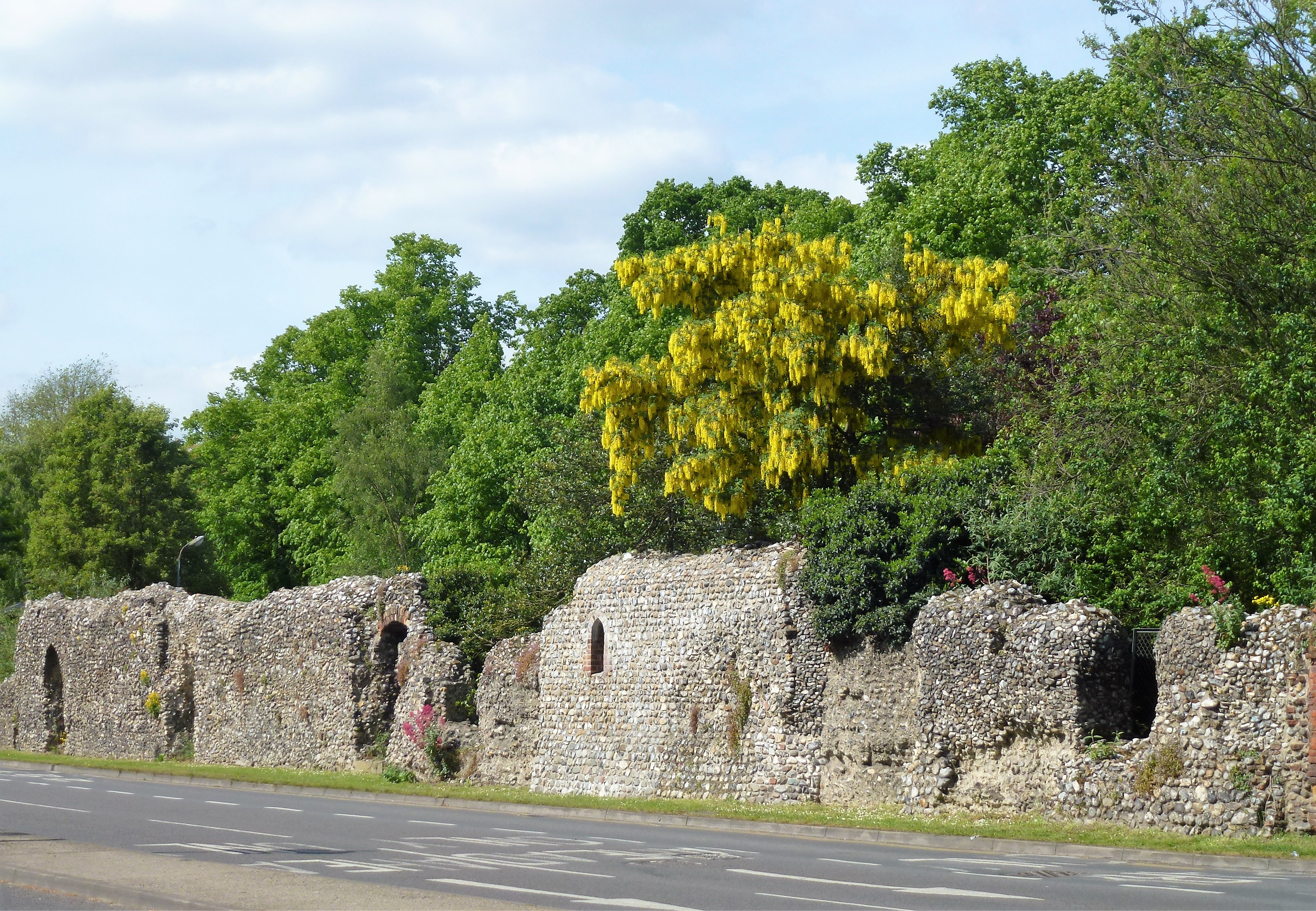
A section of the Norwich city walls bordering the gardens on Chapelfield Road

One of the earliest sections of Norwich's flint city wall was built on what would be the future boundary of Chapelfield Gardens, possibly dating from around 1253. This was referred to directly in 1256. The chapel of St Mary in the Fields was associated with the land on which Chapelfield Gardens now resides; in 1406 the citizens of Norwich "claimed four acres and an half of ground which belonged to Chapel in the Field [...] lying in Chapel-field Croft, within the city ditch, on which it abutted south". "Chapelfield" gets its name from this association. The land was used for farming at this time.

=== Private ownership and mixed use ===
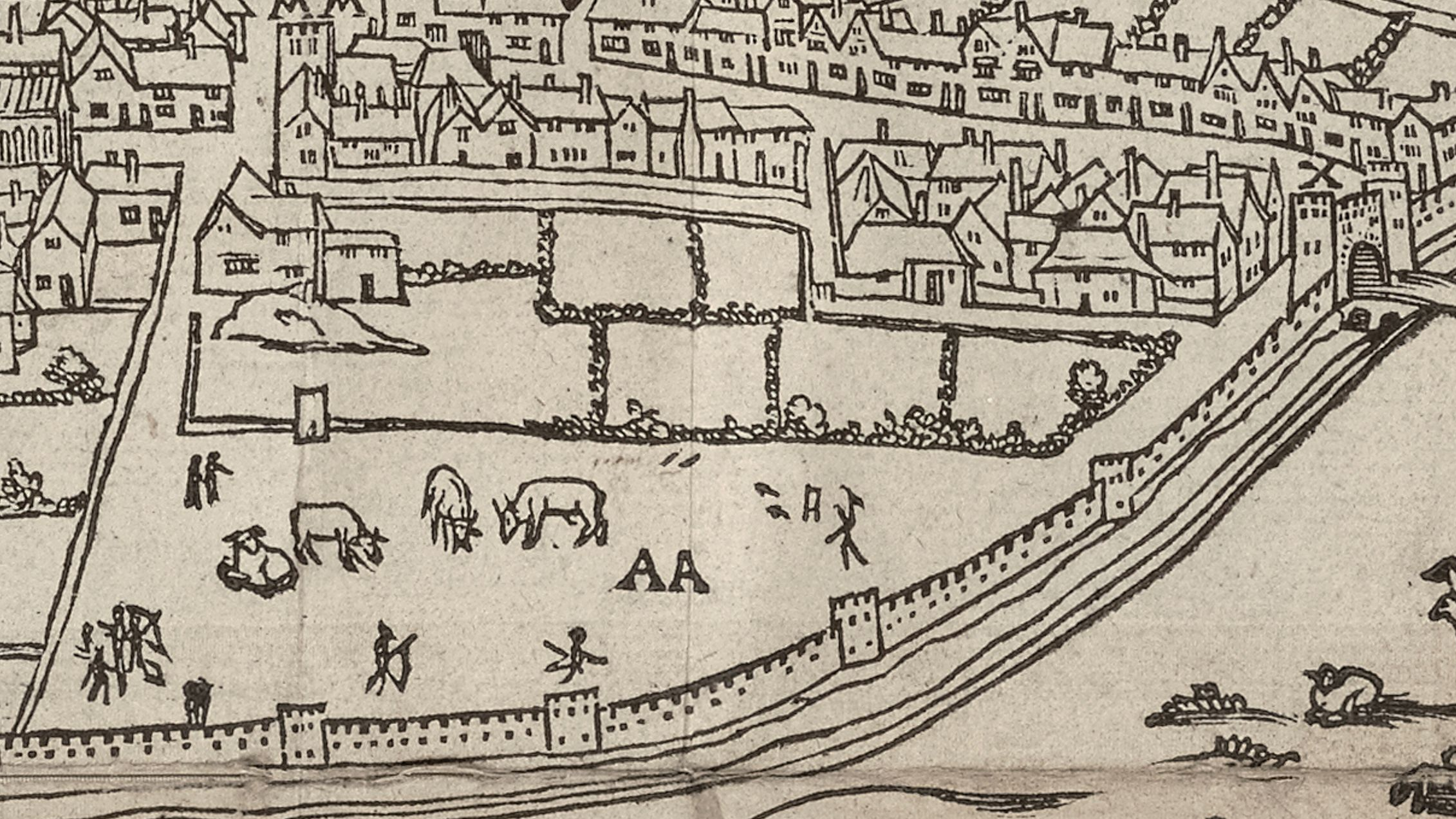
The Cuningham Prospect, which shows Norwich in 1558, depicts the Chapel Field with cattle and archers

The chapel was destroyed in the dissolution of the monasteries in 1545 and the land was granted to a private citizen. In 1558, Cuningham's map of Norwich showed the triangle of open ground that would become Chapelfield Gardens, including grazing cattle and practising archers. The land was sold to the city in 1569 to be held in a trust. It was leased during this time, also as archery butts and as grazing land. In 1579, the Norwich corporation ordered that part of Chapel Field should be explicitly designated a training ground for the "exercysyng of shotyng and for the learning to shoote in any manner of handegonnes, harquebuzes, callivers, or suche lyke", though the field had already been historically used for this practice. At this point, Chapel Field was about 8 acres (32,000 m^{2}) in size, and by the end of the century had multiple uses including military training. Another use had become morning exercise for those with time on their hands; this was formalised into a walkway which was specifically demarcated for gentlemen and ladies of leisure. "At the expense of Tom Templeman", this walkway was later lined with avenues of trees.

In the 17th century, one Sir John Hobart of Blickling may have used the nearby Chapel Field House as a town residence, and took a 40-year lease on the open land later to become Chapelfield Gardens. This included "the right to take musters and mustering of men and horses and exercising them in military discipline and also for pitching of any tents for the use of musters and for the erecting and making of Butts [...] and also for repairing the city walls and to pitch stages for that purpose." At the beginning of the riot on 24 April 1648 which led to the Great Blow at Committee House close by, pro-royalist crowds mustered in the Chapel Field, as it was then called, as well as in the nearby market.

=== Development into a pleasure garden ===
The leases of the land handed out by the city developed, and by 1655 they included the "rights of citizens of ingress and egress [...] to walk for their recreation at all times", meaning that the field was now used for the public benefit. On 31 March 1677, marshals were sent multiple times to apprehend boys who had been "stripping themselves naked and running about Chapel Field". A similar event took place in 1682, when "boys and young fellows" were stopped from playing in Chapel Field, as well as the churchyard of St Augustine's and the castle dykes. A 1696 map of Norwich by Thomas Cleer shows that Chapel Field had become integrated into the formal landscaped gardens of Chapel Field House, with the avenues and walks becoming what Fiona Williamson has described as the city's earliest pleasure garden. This began the transformation of the area into the centre of an entertainment district for the wealthy, with Chapel Field House operating as a scene for grand assemblies nearby.

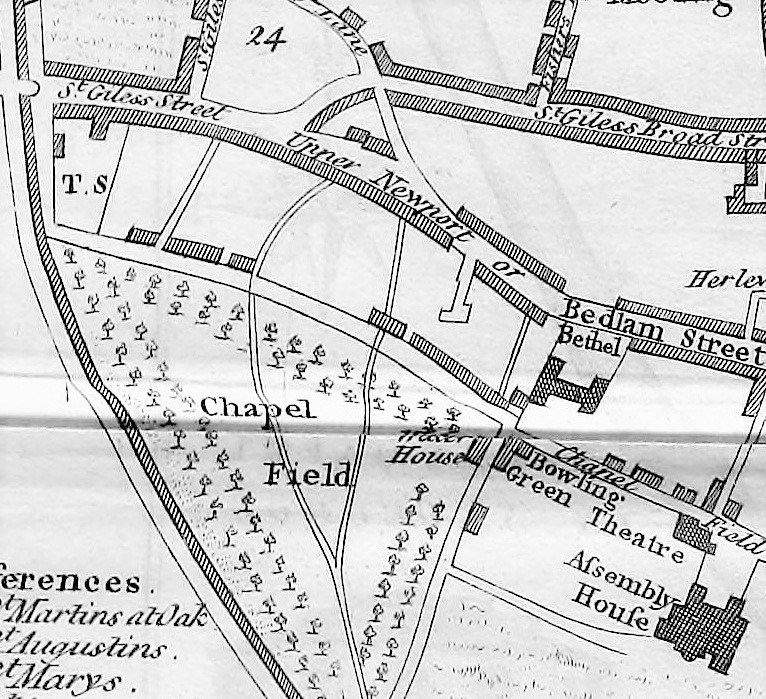
A 1781 map of Norwich including Chapel Field

In 1707, the grounds were fenced off. In the early 18th century, the formerly open space between the house and pleasure garden was developed into a theatre and a bowling green. Walks were laid out in the area in 1746. In the mid-18th century, Sir Thomas Churchman held the lease; he put down three main walks featuring avenues of elm trees which proved popular walking places. At the end of the century, the Norwich city corporation leased the central area to the Waterworks Company, which constructed a reservoir and water tower, detracting from the aesthetic appeal of the walks significantly. By 1780 the reservoir had extended up to the city wall, with spoil being dumped over the gardens. Responding to the public's annoyance, Castle Ditches was opened as a public park instead. By the 1830s, the water from the reservoir began to drain away, later being replaced by Heigham and Lakenham water works in 1840. Contemporary accounts from the 1840s said the gardens had become "the resort of loose and idle boys and being occupied partly by washerwomen seem[ed] to be in great measure deserted by respectable citizens."

=== As a public park ===
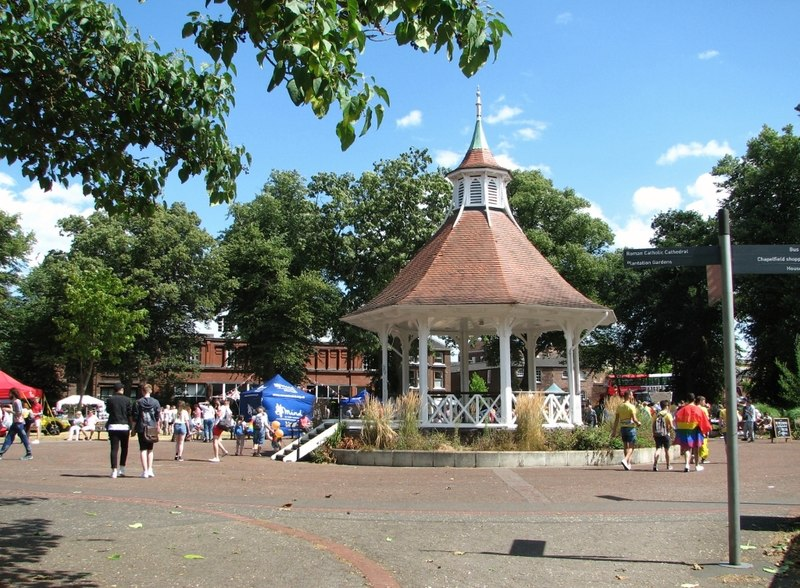
The park's polygonal bandstand was built in 1880

In 1852 the Waterworks Company agreed to give up their lease in exchange for the city corporation laying out the land as a public garden. This unofficially made the gardens a park; the opening of the gardens was reported on 17 April. After an elaborate plan by the company, which included a central pond and the water tower being turned into a gazebo, was simplified in favour of a cheaper option with intersecting avenues, the Prince and Princess of Wales planted a Wellingtonia in 1866, marking the council's agreement to lay out the gardens. In 1867, a drill hall and an iron palisade to enclose the site were both erected, and replacement planting in the elm avenues took place, with several dignitaries also planting specimen trees. There were also "efforts [...] made to level the area".

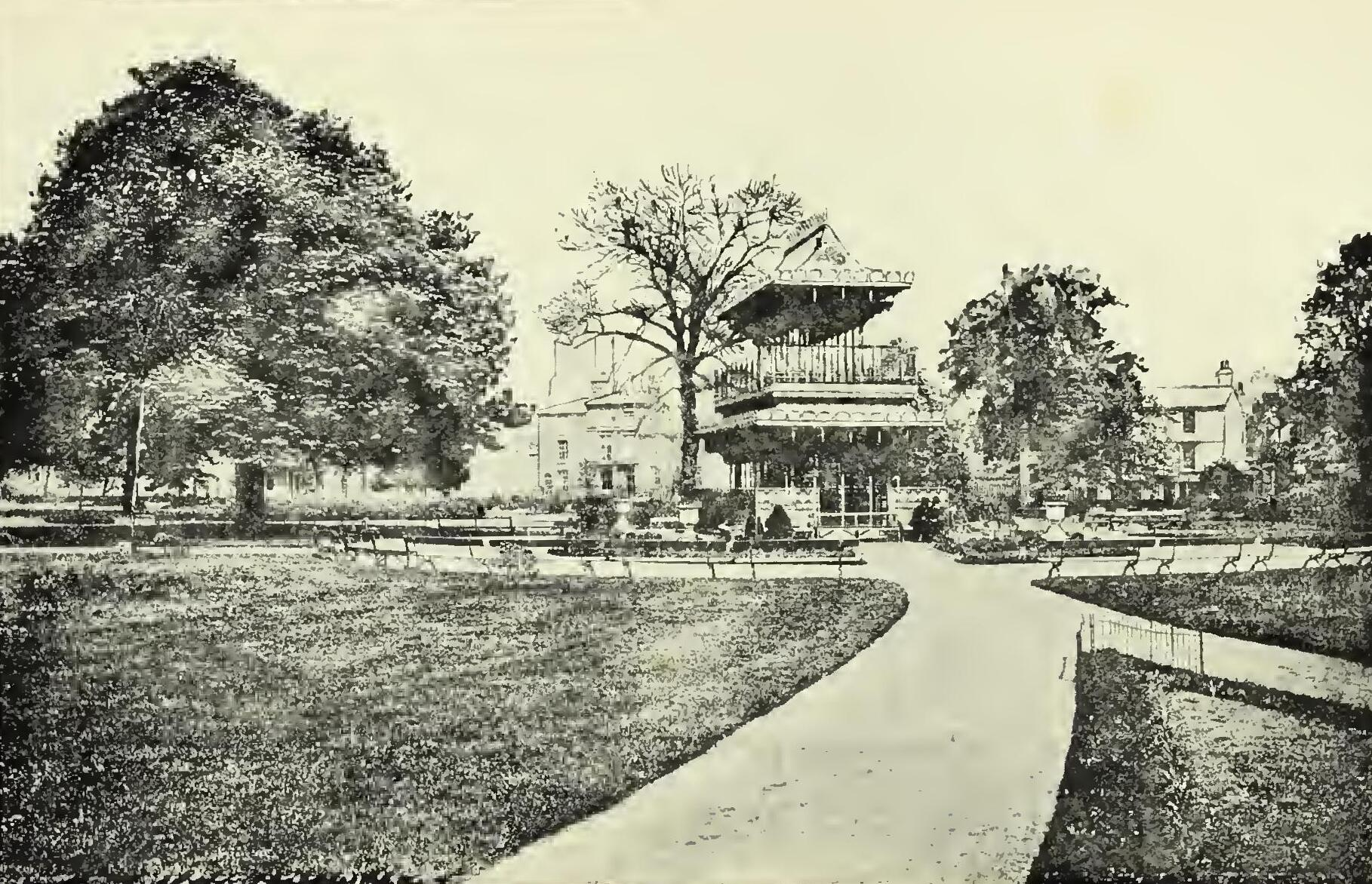
A 40-ton iron pagoda stood in the gardens from after its appearance at the 1876 Philadelphia Exhibition until it was demolished in 1949 after bombing.

A 40-ton pagoda made of cast and wrought iron, designed by Thomas Jeckyll for the 1876 Philadelphia Exhibition and created by Barnard, Bishop & Barnards, later known as the pavilion and now the site of a refreshment building, was erected after being bought by the Norwich Corporation. During its existence, the pagoda exhibited products made by Barnard's as well as designs by Jekyll. A polygonal bandstand was added in 1880. A map in 1883 shows houses obscuring both sides of the city wall that borders the Chapelfield Road side. A children's play area was added by 1899. In the early part of the 20th century, the walks which were somewhat elaborate and serpentine were simplified, and a refreshment pavilion was built. The pagoda was restored.

Activity in Chapelfield Gardens during the Second World War is visible on aerial photographs. This included a barrage balloon site, underground shelters, huts and hardstandings for structures, and several possible Air Raid Precautions (ARP) posts or Home Guard shelters. The pagoda was demolished in 1949 after sustaining damage from bombing, and was replaced by a refreshment shelter with a similar footprint. In 1963, the inner city ring road was constructed; the corner of the gardens where Chapel Field Road meets Chapel Field North was lost, along with the drill hall, as the result of the building of Grapes Hill roundabout in the 1970s.

=== Contemporary use ===
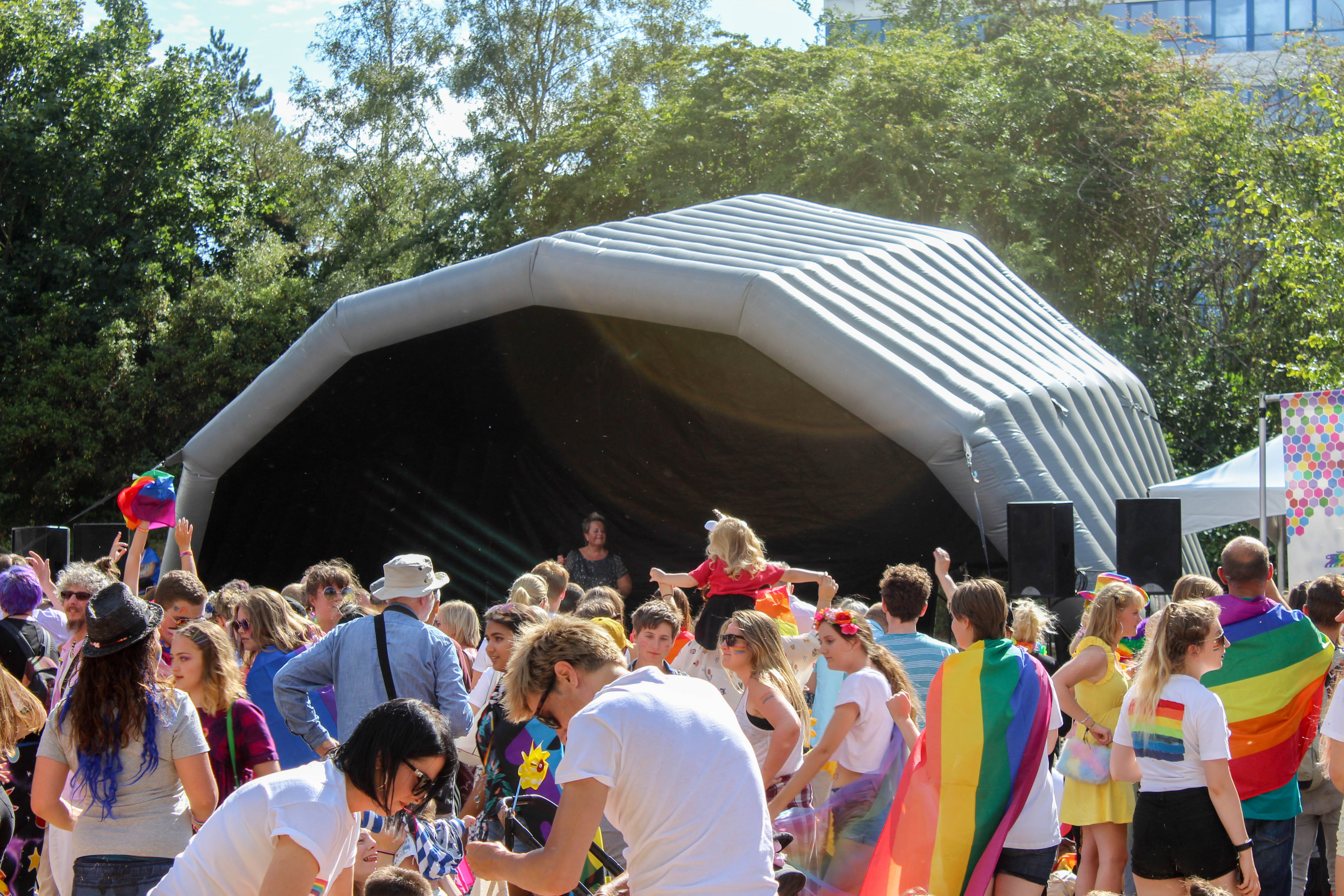
Norwich Pride in Chapelfield Gardens in 2018

In 1994 the Second World War air raid shelters, as well as bomb craters, under the Gardens were rediscovered. As of 1997, the Gurney Clock was being kept in the middle of the park. It was given to the city by Barclays bank in 1987 after being created in 1974 by Martin Burgess. In 2000, to mark the jubilee of Queen Elizabeth II, Mark Goldsworthy was commissioned by the Norfolk Contemporary Art Society to create Will Kemp and His Morris Men, a wooden sculpture for the gardens. The gardens became Grade II listed in 2002. They have been part of Norwich Pride celebrations since its first event in 2009, with these celebrations centring in the park in 2023. Historic England awarded £315,000 to Norwich City Council for a 2026 restoration and repair of the bandstand as part of its Heritage at Risk scheme; this added a ramp for improved accessibility while preserving its historic features.
