= Great Blow =

1648 riot and explosion in Norwich, England

The Great Blow
- Part of the Second English Civil War
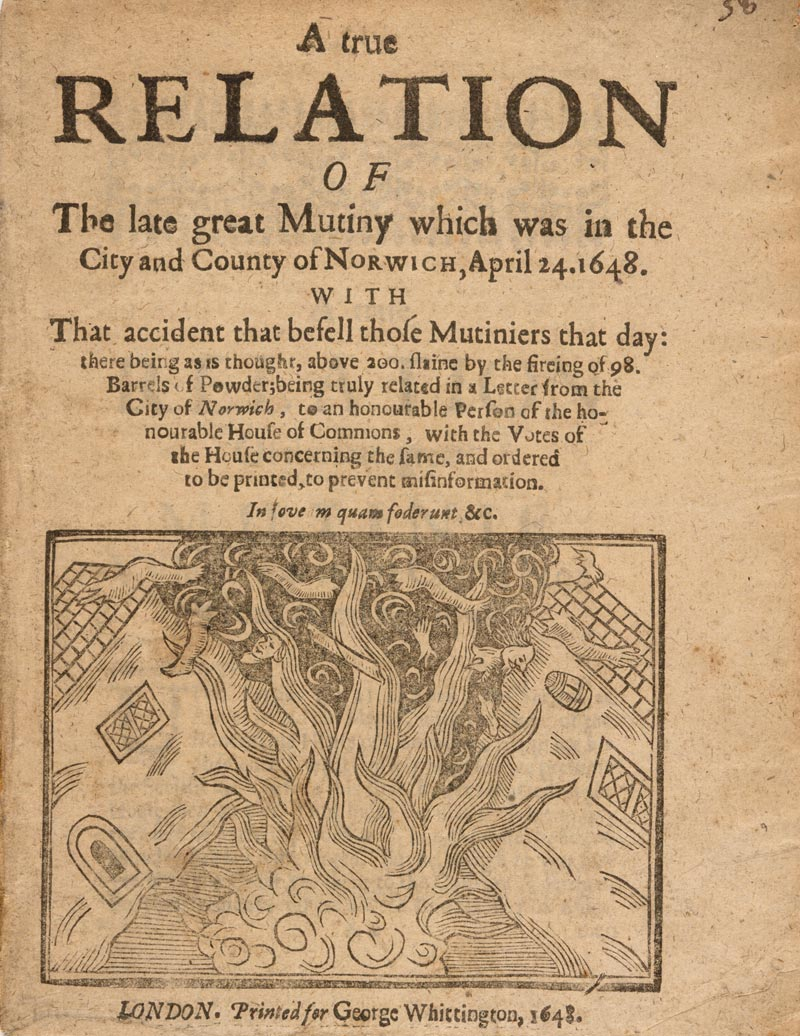
- A pamphlet about the riot published in London features a woodcut artist's impression of the resultant explosion.
- Date: 24 April 1648
- Location: Norwich, United Kingdom; 52.6280°N 1.2896°E
- Caused by: Petition against Mayor John Utting
- Goals: Prevention of Utting's departure to London

Parties
| Pro-Royalist rioters | Regiment of Colonel Charles Fleetwood |

Number
| Up to 1,000 rioters | Over 80 soldiers |

Casualties
- Deaths: 80–200
- Damage: 40 buildings destroyed
- Charged: 108
- Fined: 26
- Executed: 8
- The explosion took place at Committee House, now the site of the former Bethel Hospital.

The Great Blow or Great Blowe was a pro-royalist riot and resultant explosion that took place on 24 April 1648 in Norwich during the Second English Civil War. 98 barrels of gunpowder were accidentally detonated in Committee House, causing the largest explosion recorded in England during the 17th century.

The riot can be attributed to many complex causes including excise tax, strict policies upon churches, and impressment. The inciting incident was an 18 April 1648 petition which accused the Norwich Mayor John Utting of helping royalists into local power and requested that he should be taken in custody to the House of Commons in London. A counter-petition from Utting encouraged a royalist riot. The riot spread from the city's market and Chapel Field to the houses of the mayor's supporters and the gunpowder stores in Committee House. The subsequent accidental explosion is due to an unknown direct cause.

Contemporary estimates of deaths caused by the explosion varied between 80 and 200. Forty buildings were destroyed, amounting to an estimated £20,000 (equivalent to £2,840,425 in 2023) of damage. The windows of two nearby churches were shattered by the blast. Eight men were executed for their apparent roles in the riot of the 108 who stood trial; 26 of the others were fined £30, seven were imprisoned and two were whipped. The explosion and its context were named a 'mutiny', 'blow' or 'crack' by its contemporaries.

== Background ==
The causes of the Great Blow in the English city of Norwich are considered numerous and complex, such that Fiona Williamson has argued the riot was not royalist. In 1648, Norwich was home to 20,000 people, up to a fifth being Dutch and Walloon immigrants, and was the largest provincial city in England. It had not been besieged in the Civil Wars, unlike other provincial capitals such as York, Bristol and Exeter. In the early 1640s it had seen no fighting. But, it was equally considered a highly political city. While East Anglia as a whole is considered a parliamentarian heartland during the English Civil Wars, being deep within the powerful Eastern Association, Norwich was deeply divided by 1648 and harboured a number of royalist supporters. These had been influenced by the 1643 arrest of William Gostlin, the city's royalist sympathising mayor, as well as the mustering of Parliamentary troops through volunteers and later impressment, stricter policies on the city's churches and cathedral including an order that Christmas Day 1645 should not be observed as a festival, and a pamphlet war between Presbyterians and Independents. There is evidence of a royalist culture based in Norwich's taverns in the 1640s. Royalist Robert Holmes was elected as sheriff by the freemen in September 1646.

Additionally, taxes had been increased to record levels to fund Parliament's war effort, including an excise tax which especially hit the poor, provoking riots by the city's butchers by December 1646, though the tax on meat and domestic salt production was removed in June 1647. A plague epidemic had taken place in November 1646 alongside floods in riverside parishes, heavy snowfall and thunderstorms. The 1549 Kett's Rebellion was still being commemorated in the early 1640s with annual thanksgiving days. Residents of Norwich would have also been aware of the 1643 three-week siege of King's Lynn by the Earl of Manchester, after which the town became an effective military garrison under command of Colonel Valentine Walton.

=== Prominent individuals involved ===
Captain Thomas Ashwell, a sheriff and prominent Puritan of the Norwich corporation, was particularly unpopular among the city's royalists due to his radical Independency and position as an ex-New Model Army officer. Ashwell was a ringleader of the faction against the Mayor of Norwich at the time, John Utting. As sheriff and sergeant major, he had the responsibility for the city's armoury. The similarly unpopular alderman Adrian Parmenter was a sub-commissioner for excise, his house being the Excise Office which had previously been involved in the December 1646 anti-excise riots. Thomas Baret was an alderman and a similarly prominent corporation Puritan. His ageing father, ex-mayor Christopher Baret, was also Puritan.

The Mayor of Norwich at the time, John Utting, was a moderate Presbyterian and a conservative politician who tactically favoured balance when tackling religious extremism, and this had alienated Puritans in the corporation. Utting was rumoured to hold royalist sympathies, though there is little evidence of this. On 1 December 1647, a group of apprentices presented Utting with a petition which defended the celebration of Christmas, which had been declared a punishable offence in England by an ordinance of Parliament on 10 June that year. This petition received criticism from Ashwell and Baret. In March 1648, Utting also allowed the election of ineligible royalist Roger Mingay, who was considered a delinquent, to the aldermanic seat in the parish of St Peter Mancroft, an action in contravention of two ordinances from 1620 and 1648. Mingay was Utting's brother-in-law, and would usually have been ineligible as he had not previously been sheriff. Furthermore in February 1648, Utting permitted bonfires and feasts to be prepared that would celebrate the accession of Charles I to the throne.

=== Petition against Mayor John Utting ===
Utting's sanction of celebrations prompted Ashwell and Baret to take action. On 18 April, the pair presented a petition to the House of Commons against Norwich mayor John Utting, stating that he had permitted the election of Mingay, allowed the voting of such people in municipal elections, and employed "sequestered and malignant parsons" to preach in Norwich churches, including the cathedral. While its subtext displays dissatisfaction that Utting had ignored the Puritans' pleas to further reform local churches, the petition explicitly requested that the controversial appointment of this alderman and some others be investigated, stating that their appointment was in contravention of a House of Commons ordinance of 14 March 1647. The Commons thus ordered that he be brought up to Westminster by a pursuivant messenger for questioning on 24 April, and assigned Christopher Baret as his temporary replacement as deputy mayor, to which Utting would be told to agree.

=== Counter-petition ===
In response, Utting and his friends, including six aldermen, particularly his close associate alderman John Tooley, asked town clerk Thomas Balleston to draft a counter-petition highlighting Utting’s "good government and behaviour", and requesting fair passage to London. This counter-petition spoke highly of Utting's conduct as mayor. The choice to launch a counter-petition was informed by the previous fate of Mayor Goslyn, a royalist-sympathiser who had been arrested and his aldermen supporters pushed out of the corporation by March 1643. Though this cannot be confirmed as the counter-petition has not survived, some historical sources state that it requested that Utting not be removed from Norwich. This counter-petition was made official on 22 April during a meeting of the Court of Aldermen. It needed to be ready to travel to London with the mayor, leaving only one day and night to garner enough supporting signatures.

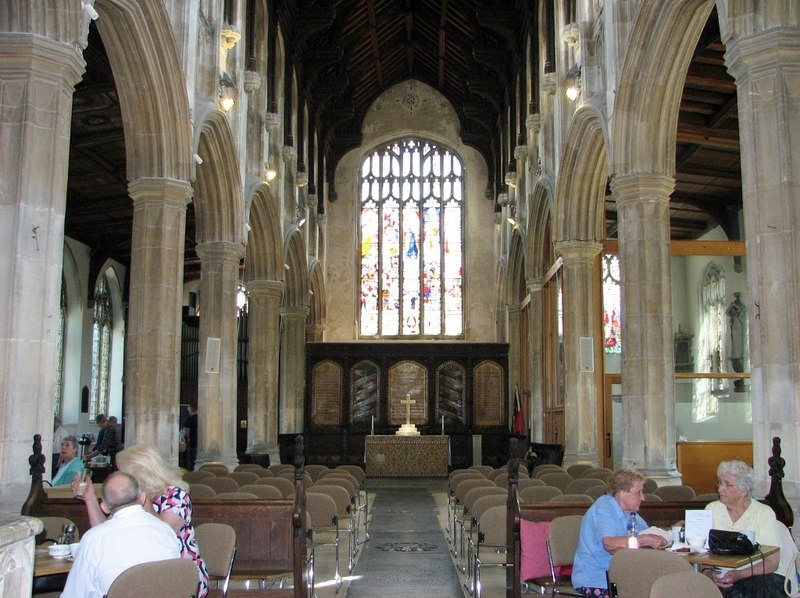
Signatures were taken for the counter-petition on the St Stephen's Church communion table

The messenger arrived in Norwich with Utting's summons on 23 April, and would proceed to spend time discussing this with Utting at the King's Head, a popular inn with overnight rooms, next to the city's market and Market Cross, and also very close to Utting's home in the St Peter Mancroft parish. That day, the counter-petition was read aloud to congregations in Norwich after divine worship at Sunday services to solicit signatures, with signatures being taken on the communion table in St Stephen's Church. Rumours circulated that more than 80 people had signed the counter-petition at St Mary's Church. The counter-petition was also circulated at the busiest inns and taverns in the city, exploiting implicit knowledge that drinking houses were channels of communication. Sites near the marketplace were particularly targeted for this so as to allow them to mobilise those who could best influence the situation, as well as ordinary people.

Utting and the messenger lodged at the King's Head overnight as papers were posted on walls and posts which incited people to arm themselves to protect the mayor. The door to the mayor's house was guarded overnight. Utting's actions on this night are disputed by alleged witnesses; Mary Fordham swore she had seen Utting ask a man to "go and resolve the people" and find some muskets, whereas John Graye stated Utting's only involvement was an attempt to calm his supporters' spirits, sending one of his maids to give his thanks and tell them to go home. This appeal for calm was allegedly issued despite Utting being technically deposed.

On the night of 23 April, papers that incited the city's inhabitants to arm themselves and protect the mayor were put up on walls and posts; those trying to remove them were faced with violent intimidation. Christopher Bransby led a company to Norwich's various city gates during the evening and demanded that the watchmen keep them locked to prevent the mayor being taken away; several of them agreed and gave him their keys. In the White Lion, a notorious inn in the city, barber Richard Haddon heard that "certain gentlemen" had discussed publicly how they "wo[u]ld stand by" Utting and not allow him to leave. The presence of "Comittee men" at this inn, including ex-mayors "Mr Toly and Watts" and James Sheringham who "had collected funds" for Utting's cause, was confirmed by one Nicholas Dawes. Thomas Palgrave, a merchant who lived at White Lion Lane and friend of Norfolk landowner Sir John Potts, was seen buying drinks to encourage people to pledge themselves to Utting. This was encouraged by the White Lion's tapster William Blackamoore, who was said to have used "any motive or speech to stirr up the people against the Tro[o]pe that wer[e] come into Norwich to stand upon the[i]r g[u]ard & shew them selves men". Night watchman John Wilson visited the Angel Inn located between the King's Head and White Lion, and found that 20 people were still drinking at midnight, contrary to statute. These individuals said they had been given their ale by a gentleman "who hoped they were for the King, and that they would not let Mr Mayor go out of the city".

== Initial riot ==
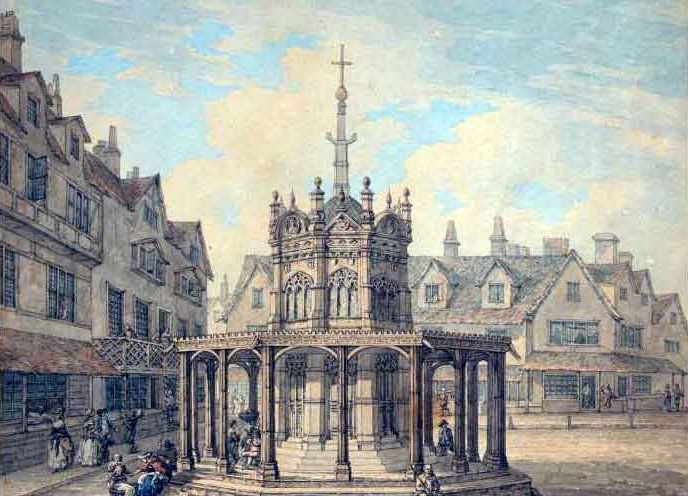
Rioters initially gathered around the Market Cross outside the King's Head inn

Under the influence of alcohol, groups of men exited the drinking houses into the Back of the Inns area, behind the inns from the market, firing shots and shouting abuse at passers-by. Groups of people began to gather to shout abuse at Baret and threatened to hang Ashwell and the pursuivant on the Castle Mound. A large crowd had gathered by the late evening and some of them armed themselves; a phrase by which they could identify each other, "for God and King Charles", was given out.

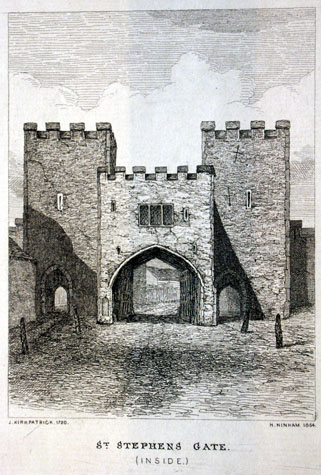
The messenger left out of St Stephen's gate (pictured here in 1720) after 10 am

Two gunshots were let off as a signal in the early hours of Monday 24 April 1648. This incited a large crowd, estimated by those present as up to 1,000, to gather at and around the city's Market Cross. By the morning, around 2,000 of Utting's supporters were waiting outside the King's Head at the market. Further crowds mustered in the open space of the Chapel Field, and others came from poorer outlying parishes in the south and west. The rioters were royalist, and consisted of butchers, lower-level tradesmen, labourers and apprentices from the Mancroft and Conesford areas of Norwich. The crowd attempted to get inside the King's Head inn, attempting to prevent Utting's departure, but were prevented from doing so by a narrow, guarded gateway to the inn's yard. Around 10 am, sheriff Felix Forby who was "much loved by the commons" called for the crowd to leave, but was unable to disperse them. The trained army bands were also not mobilised as their colonel would not send out the warrants for them to do so. The messenger left soon after 10 am, being hustled out of the city by the rioters, and escorted out of St Stephen's gate. The sheriff could not disperse the crowd, and the trained bands were not mobilized as their colonel refused to send out warrants. Thomas Palgrave was later accused of discharging his pistol three times and rallying the rioters to violence.

Though the immediate aim of the riot had ended, the riot itself continued. After breaking off from the marketplace crowd, one group ran riot through the streets, looting the houses of Parliamentarian aldermen as they went. These houses were large and were prominently placed on the prime streets of the city. Crowds converged on the house of Ashwell, which stood next to the Church of St Michael-at-Plea. Ashwell was subject to rumours of stockpiling arms; upon looting his house, rioters found weapons which were later used to capture the Committee House. The house of alderman Adrian Parmenter along Ber Street on Hogg Hill, which also operated as the excise office, was targeted.

=== Looting of Committee House ===
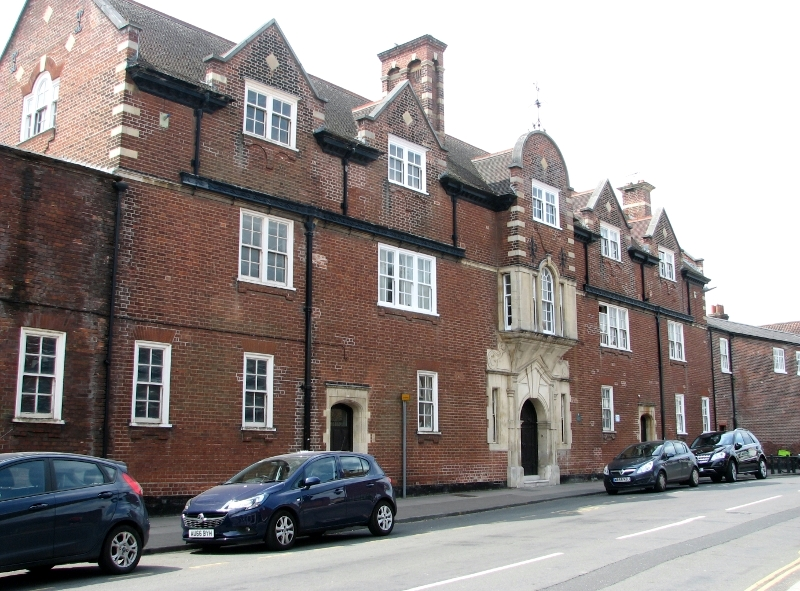
The former Bethel Hospital now sits on the site of Committee House, where the Great Blow itself took place

Around 2 pm, the Committee House, which contained the 3,000 arms of the county magazine and was a symbol of Parliament's power over the city, was targeted by the rioters. One deponent in the later trials stated that saddler Henry Goward suggested this move with the intention of searching for more weapons, as the rioters had largely been equipped with improvised weapons such as bill hooks, pitchforks and spits. Its doors were broken through and armourer Samuel Cawthorne was assaulted for shooting a boy during the fighting. The rioters made attempts to destroy unpopular taxation and sequestration records, going as far as to "cast out great bundles of writings att the wyndowes". They were careless with the gunpowder stored there, scattering it over the floor and stairs, with some walking around the house with lanterns and even naked lights. One rioter later described how he had filled his hat with gunpowder he had swept from the building's stairs. The crowd armed themselves with weapons taken from Committee House as well as Ashwell's house.

The shop owned by Thomas Baret was attacked with stones thrown through its windows. Baret carried news of the riot to part of Colonel Charles Fleetwood's Eastern Association regiment of the New Model Army in East Dereham. Though the men had just dispensed to their nearby quarters, Captain Richard Sankey gathered his own troop as well as 20 of Captain Stephen White's; they rode to Norwich on a "furious march". 80 troops arrived in Norwich at around 4 pm. They forced their way into the city after entering through its unsecured gates. When the cavalry arrived, fighting was at its most intense around St Stephen's Street. Women and young boys participated in the fight against the soldiers; one trooper later testified that one Margaret Secker thrust a spit through the ribs of his horse and her husband John struck him with a watch-bill. The soldiers were later joined by Captain Griffith Lloyd's troop. Fleetwood's troops chased the rioters through the streets of the St Stephen and St Peter Mancroft parishes, stamping out resistance in these parishes despite the rioters' verbal abuse. These rioters took refuge at the Committee House. A gunfight developed around Committee House in the rain. Captain Lloyd as well as several other soldiers were harmed during fighting in the street.

== Explosion ==
It is unknown what caused the explosion at Committee House, though historians have speculated that it may have been a cord which was dropped from a matchlock musket, which then ignited spilt gunpowder close to the barrel store. The building exploded with the force of around 90 to 98 barrels of gunpowder, the largest explosion in 17th-century England. This has been compared to the 36 barrels which were planned to be detonated under the Houses of Parliament in the Gunpowder Plot. Timber, tiles, wood, plaster, stone, lead and human remains were scattered for miles around the explosion's vicinity. Colonel Fleetwood later remarked that the explosion "did shake the whole City [and] threw down part of some Churches, wounded and killed a great many of the Inhabitants, the certain number not being yet known, nor many of them that were killed as yet found, or can be known". A later pamphlet tells of "here armes and there legges of dead men scattered … [and] these blody men that but now threatened to make the ensuing night the most blody night Norwich ever saw, were before night sent into the land of darknesse".

The exact death toll is unclear. A letter from Christopher Baret written on 4 May states that some 40 rioters died, with 120 others wounded, some mortally so. Onlooker Joseph Paine estimated on the day that 80 people were killed and more were wounded in total, commenting that "they are now pulling the mangled bodys out of the rubbish." This estimate increased to 120 missing and mortally wounded people, or even 200 rioters dead, according to various tracts printed in London, the latter figure being from the contemporary pamphlet titled the True Relation of the Late Great Mutinie. Antiquarian Walter Rye, in a survey of parish registers, confirmed 11 deaths. Bulstrode Whitlocke, who reported 120 citizens missing, wrote that "legs and arms were found in the streets, torn from the bodies." No soldiers were harmed in the explosion itself.

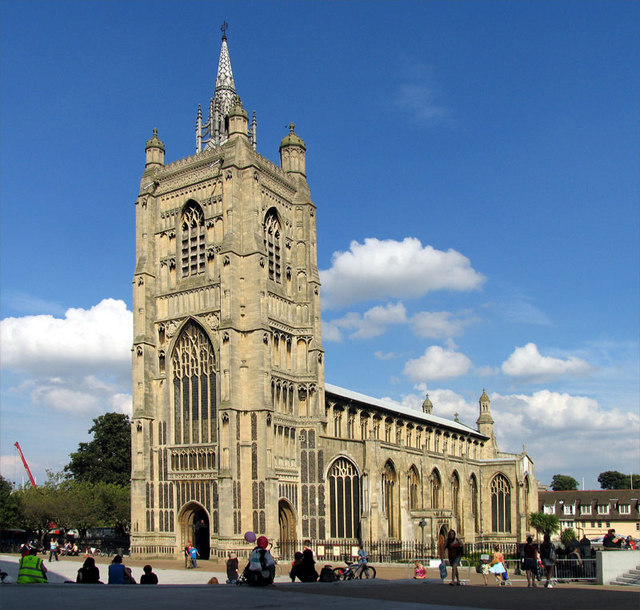
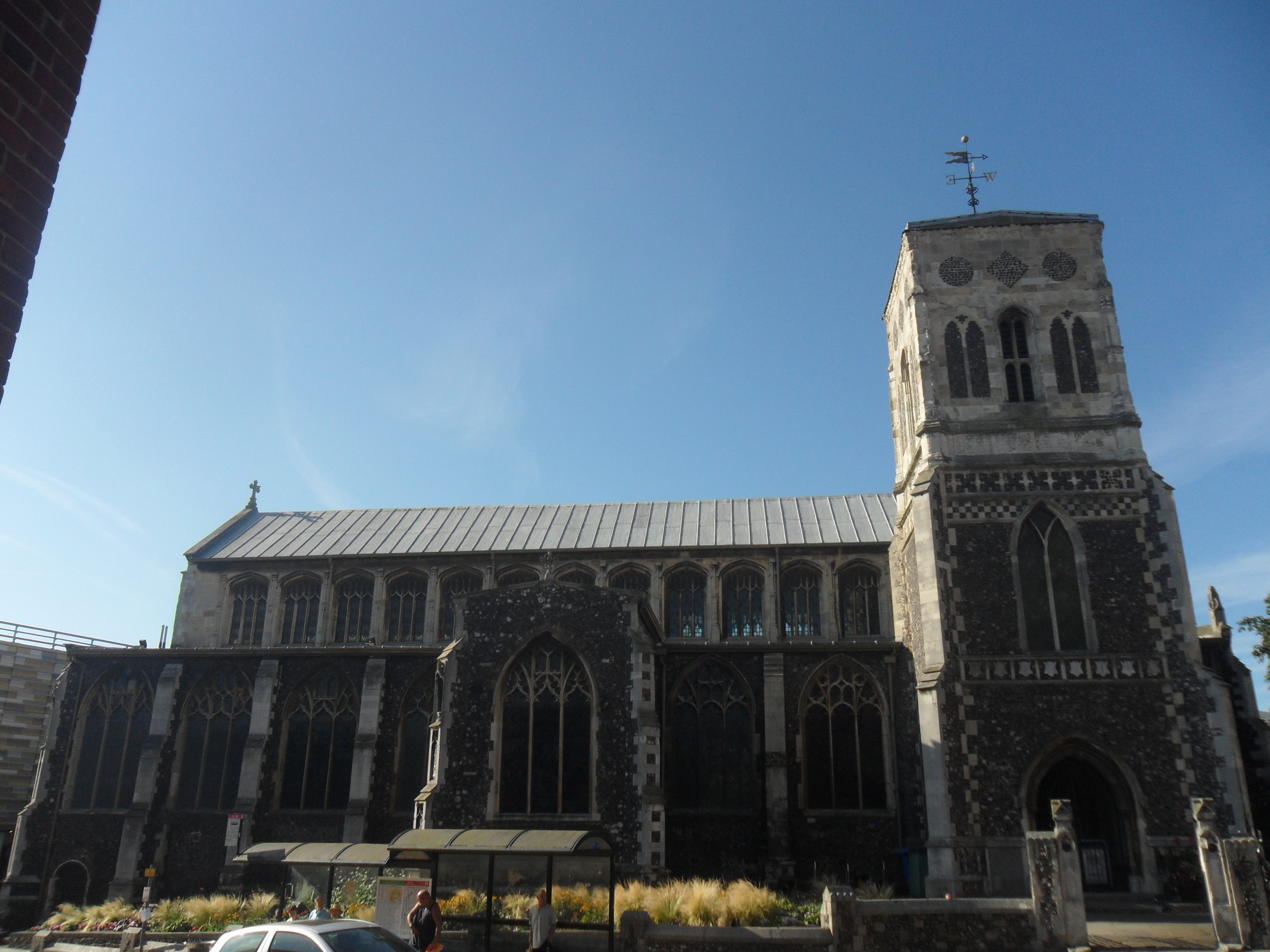
The Churches of St Peter Mancroft and St Stephen's windows were shattered in the blast

The blast destroyed 40 houses and blew out the windows of buildings in the marketplace and as far as St Gregory's parish. St Stephen and St Peter Mancroft churches also had their windows blown out. These had to be boarded up to prevent looting. The total damage to both churches was estimated at £20,000.

== Aftermath ==
The riot ended quickly after the explosion. Individuals fled the scene either in fear of their lives or of arrest, often to drinking houses including the White Lion inn in Bethel Street (not the White Lion next to the King's Head), the Black Swan inn, and also the Borrow's Head inn on Upper St Giles' Street. The places where individuals commonly went after the explosion follow a direct path from the explosion to the closest gate out of the city. Weapons looted from Committee House and Ashwell's house were hidden around the city after the riot. Many rioters were arrested and placed in the castle gaol. Though English antiquarian Francis Blomefield wrote that Utting and his friends departed on 25 April to ride to Parliament and surrender themselves, other sources show that Utting and alderman John Tooley were arrested. Utting's mayoralty was suspended, and Christopher Baret took over as deputy mayor. Whitlocke wrote that all was quiet by the evening.

The day after the explosion, three men who were killed "by gunpowder" were buried in the parish of St Peter Mancroft, four were buried in St Lawrence's, and three in St John's, Timberhill, one of whom was "killed by a trooper", and seven in St Stephen's.

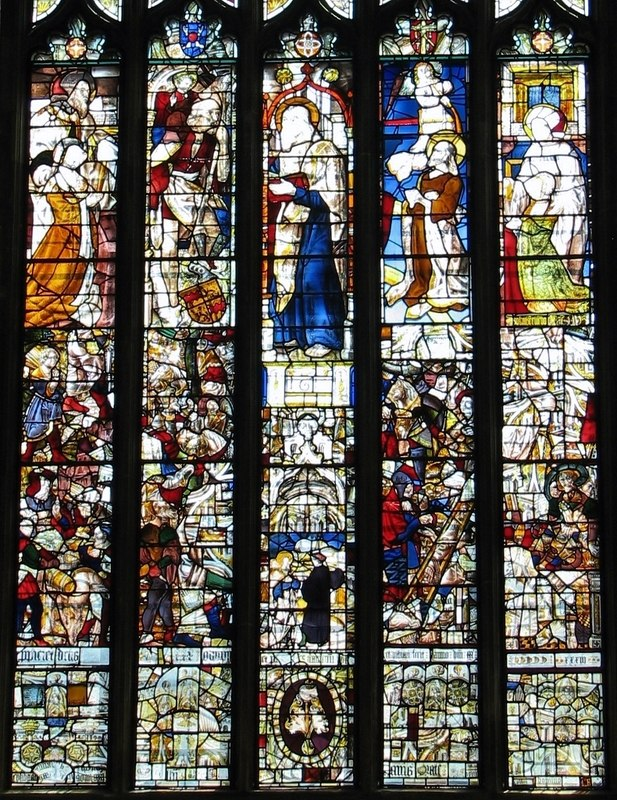
St Stephen's stained glass window was reassembled after the explosion, though five figures imported from the Mariawald monastery in Germany, originally created in 1511, were also added.

On 26 April, the Norwich Assembly ordered that Thursday 27 April would be a Day of Thanksgiving for the defeat of the riot, and voted for a gratuity of £200 for the troops who had put down the riots as well as £50 for the healing of wounded soldiers and replacement of horses that had been lost. Six horse troops remained in Norwich for a short time to dissuade any further disturbances. The election of Roger Mingay was annulled, though 8 of 28 commoners and 4 of 13 aldermen still voted that his election should be confirmed. Repairs to St Stephen's were funded by a parish rate, whereas St Peter Mancroft's had to settle the parish rate through an ordinance of Parliament which MPs particularly levied upon the butchers' stalls and shops. Committee House had been reduced to ruins, stopping its owner Sir Roger Townshend from obtaining his £28 per annum rent for it from the Committee of Norfolk; twelve workmen including masons, carpenters and labourers were employed to repair it, rebuilding a wall, its roof, and its gates as well as a timber store. These works were completed by the end of May, costing £83 and 3d.

News of the riot and explosion swiftly spread to London through pamphlets, and was used as a sign of God's support for Parliament in the war.

=== Investigations ===
At least 278 testimonies of the incident, known as "informations and examinations", amounting to 55,000 words, survive in the Norwich City Records in the Norfolk Record Office, and today constitute the largest single archival collection for studying popular royalist insurgency during the English Civil War. The interrogatories themselves do not survive. The historian Andrew Hopper has argued that "much of the content reveals more about the justices' anxieties than what was actually said or done." Over 90% of the surviving testimonies were gathered between 25 April and 30 May 1648, with the last 16 being taken in July, August and October. They consist of a large number of reported anti-Roundhead street slogans, and accounts of verbal abuse against parliamentarian sympathisers.

Baret sought to use the investigation to implicate Utting and the opposition to Parliament, thereby furthering reformation in Norwich's corporation. On 4 May, he wrote to Speaker Lenthall, observing that "the petition was carried about by some in the very time of the height of the tumult, so that we conceive they were both birds of the same feather [...] I doubt not time will evince there was a greater plot in it, and a design further off than we are yet aware of." Tooley seemed to avoid punishment for the time being, instead being tasked with interrogating suspects and witnesses of the riot. Utting was, however, placed under house arrest. Another petition was put forward asking for Utting to be allowed to serve the remainder of his year as mayor; this obtained many signatures but was not followed.

The testimonies passed to the clerk of the Norfolk Assizes, who was ordered on 7 December by the House of Commons to return them to Norwich to be used for the trial of the rioters. After this, the testimonies were kept in the Guildhall. Blomefield quoted from them in his county history of Norfolk in the 1740s. They were moved to the Muniment Room in Norwich Castle in 1894, and in 1906 Sir Frederic Bateman and Walter Rye partially transcribed them.

=== Trials and executions ===
In October 1648 the Norfolk Assizes were held. On 26 October, the Norwich Assembly decided to begin trials of the "mutineers" through a special commission of oyer and terminer.

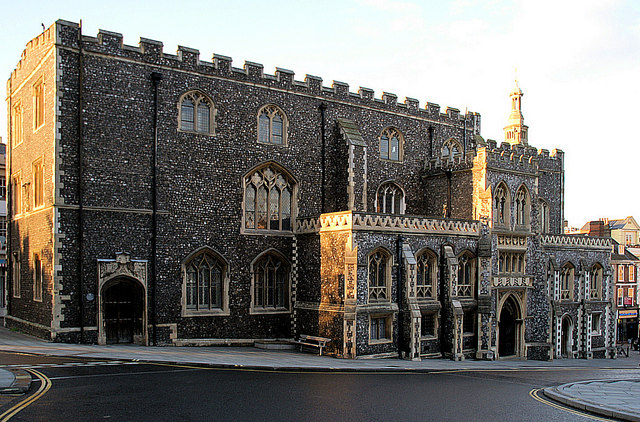
The trial of the rioters took place in Norwich Guildhall in December 1648

The accused rioters were not brought to trial in the Guildhall in 25 December as was stated by Blomefield; the trial in fact took place on 18 December according to the sessions' minute book. Erasmus Earle, recently appointed sargeant at law and steward of Norwich, presided over the trial. There, 9 or 15 of the 108 people accused were acquitted. Two of these 15 were sent to the bridewell (House of Correction) until they could ensure their future good behaviour. Eight men were sentenced to death, largely for their various activities around Committee House, as well as Ashwell's and Parmenter's houses. These included William True, a dyer who took excise money from Parmenter's house and stated he would "pay his souldgers" with it, and Henry Goward, a saddler who according to one deponent suggested the riot move to Committee House. Seven of the rioters may have also been sentenced to death, had they not been able to read the neck-verse; these people were instead imprisoned for a year. Two people, one of them a woman, were convicted of petty larceny and sentenced to be whipped, whereas 24 or 26 others were fined £30 and were imprisoned until they could pay it. James Sheringham was one of those who were fined. Others, largely lesser tradesmen, were imprisoned in Norwich Guildhall. No charges were brought against several of the rioters, including Leonard Spurgeon, Thomas Palgrave, Christopher Bransby, and a Dr Brooke who recommended that the petitioners around him bear arms. Baret pointed out that several gentry ringleaders of the riot had escaped unpunished, leading the crowd to have sympathy for them.

The eight men sentenced to death – brazier Christopher Hill, blacksmith Anthony Wilson, dyer William True, saddler Henry Goward, oatmeal maker Edward Gray, Thomas and John Bidwell, and Charles Emerson – were hanged alongside two witches in the castle ditches outside the castle on 2 January 1649.

On 12 September 1649, Parliament's judgement declared that Utting and Tooley were both "Grand Delinquents". A year after the first trials, Parliament passed judgement on Utting and Tooley on 9 October 1649. Utting had been charged with permitting to "elect unduely some persons in the place of aldermen [...] countenancing malignant and sequestered ministers publickly to preach in the city", and also of creating a rabble-rousing petition. Due to a lack of evidence, neither Utting nor Tooley were convicted for instigating the riot, though it was undisputed that their petition has led directly to the gathering of a "great concourse of people". Utting was also charged with neglecting his duties and not stopping the mob, as well as earlier charges of attempting to "elect unduely some persons in the place of aldermen" and "countenancing malignant and sequestered ministers publickly to preach in the city". Utting was fined £500 and imprisoned for six months, whereas Tooley was fined £1,000 and imprisoned for three months, both in London's Fleet Prison. Utting's fine was later reduced to £200, and Tooley's offer of £400 and full discharge was later accepted by the Norwich assembly due to "urgent occasions of this citty for money".

=== Remodelling of the Norwich corporation ===
The Rump Parliament moved quickly to stop further trouble after the Great Blow, rushing through an Act to regulate Norwich elections and ensure control remained in favourable hands. This involved debarring and disenfranchising all individuals who were implicated in the events of the riot. This Act was not all-encompassing; the Company of St George, which organised the city's annual Guild Day feast, ruled unanimously in July 1649 that those who had signed the petition in support of Utting's continued mayoralty after the riot would still be allowed to bear the feast. The Act did not apply to the Company as it sought not to be divided by political differences.

The mutiny's failure allowed for local parliamentarians who were loyal to the roundheads to remove their opponents; by September 1648 parliamentarian forces returned to full control of East Anglia. Lord Thomas Fairfax stayed in Parmenter's house when visiting the city in September 1648. The aldermen under new mayor Christopher Baret were in a good position to purge the corporation of opposition, and by 1649, all of those associated with the affair had either been removed or prohibited from holding office. A third of the common council was purged. In the spring of 1649, exclusions and elections ended the political careers of six conservative aldermen.

Due to deaths and the dismissal of those refusing the January 1650 Engagement, under which all men holding public office or places of trust had to "declare and promise" to live quietly under the new government and do nothing to undermine it, by 1652 the Norwich corporation had been almost completely remodelled.

== See also ==
- The PS Telegraph explosion – another explosion in Norwich
