= Catherine Maude Nichols =

English painter

On Norwich River, Norfolk by Catherine Maude Nichols

Catherine Maude Nichols (6 October 1847 – 30 January 1923) was a British painter and printmaker. She was born in Norwich, England, and is notable for being one of the first "lady fellows" of the Royal Society of Painter-Etchers, elected in 1882.

== Biography ==
Born in 1847, her father was W.P. Nichols, a prominent surgeon, Liberal, and former Mayor of Norwich. Her father also collected oil paintings and encouraged her love of art, sending her to the local art school, and willing her money specifically to help further her career. She studied wood engraving at the Norwich School of Art and won a prize for her work there in 1874.

Nichols made her debut at the Royal Academy of Arts in 1877. Throughout her career, she produced over 200 etchings, many of them of her home county, Norfolk.
