= Barnard, Bishop & Barnards =

Iron manufacturing business

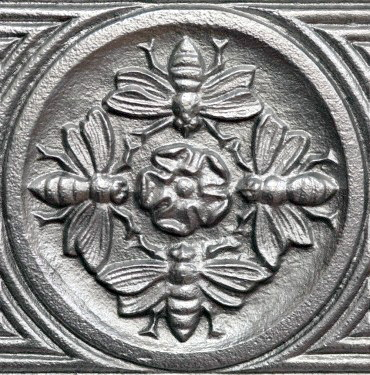
Signature medallion of the firm - a visual pun on the 4 partners' names starting with a 'B'

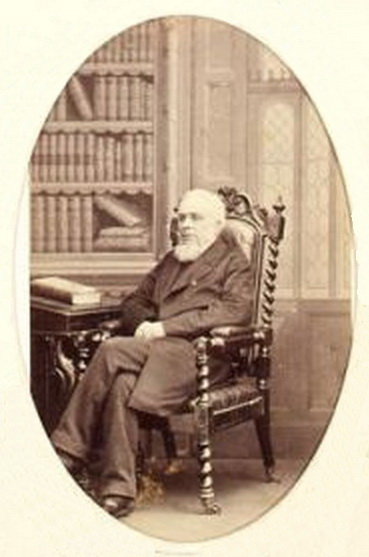
Charles Barnard

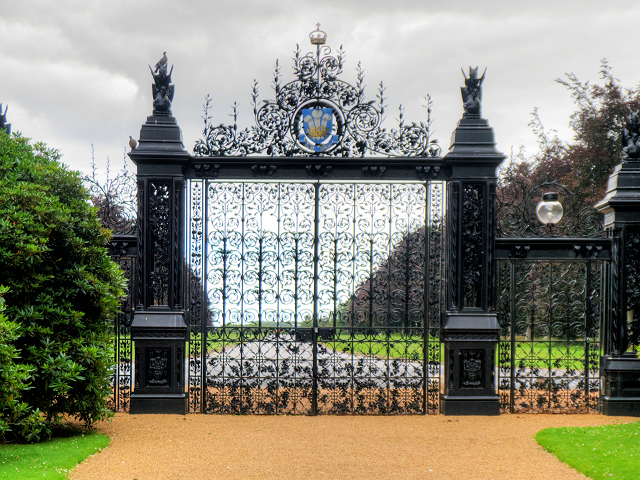
The Norwich Gates at Sandringham House constructed by Barnard, Bishop & Barnards

Barnard, Bishop & Barnards was a manufacturing and general ironmonger, initially an ironmongery started by Charles Barnard (1804-1871) on 9 November 1826 in premises near Norwich Market. By 1840 his retail business had expanded and included iron foundry workshops in Pottergate, and producing ironwork for domestic and agricultural purposes. Charles Barnard developed, but did not patent, a technique for weaving wire into black japanned netting and fencing. The original loom may be seen at the Bridewell Museum in Norwich. Fencing was in great demand in Australia to control the country's rabbit problem and ensured a fortune for Barnard.

In 1846 John Bishop, from St. Ives, joined the firm as a partner, and the flourishing business forced a move to a site bounded by St. George's, Colegate, and Calvert Streets. In 1859 Charles' two eldest sons, Charles Barnard, Jun., and Godfrey Barnard, also became partners leading to the firm's new name Barnard, Bishop & Barnards, and the adoption of its signature roundel of four bees. In 1861 Charles Barnard was recorded as proprietor of the works, employing 105 workmen, 47 boys, 7 clerks and 4 shopmen.

An 1860 project was the manufacture of an iron lighthouse for the Brazilian government. Designed by Messrs. Bramwell and Reynolds, of Westminster, it was erected on the Abrolhos Archipelago off the coast of Brazil. The lighthouse can be dismantled, all the iron plates and wood beams being numbered for ease of re-assembly.
