= Dugmore =

Dugmore is a surname. Notable people with the name include:

- Arthur Radclyffe Dugmore (1870-1955), Irish-born American naturalist and wildlife artist
- Cyril Dugmore (1882–1966), British track and field athlete
- Dan Dugmore (born c. 1949), American steel guitar musician
- Edward Dugmore (1915–1996), American abstract expressionist painter
- Geoff Dugmore (born 1960), Scottish drummer, musical director and producer
- Grant Dugmore (born 1967), South African-Argentine cricketer
- Henry Hare Dugmore (1810–1896), English missionary, writer and translator
- John Dugmore of Swaffham (1793–1871), British draughtsman and grand-tourist
