= Shirehall, Swaffham =

Judicial building in Swaffham, Norfolk, England

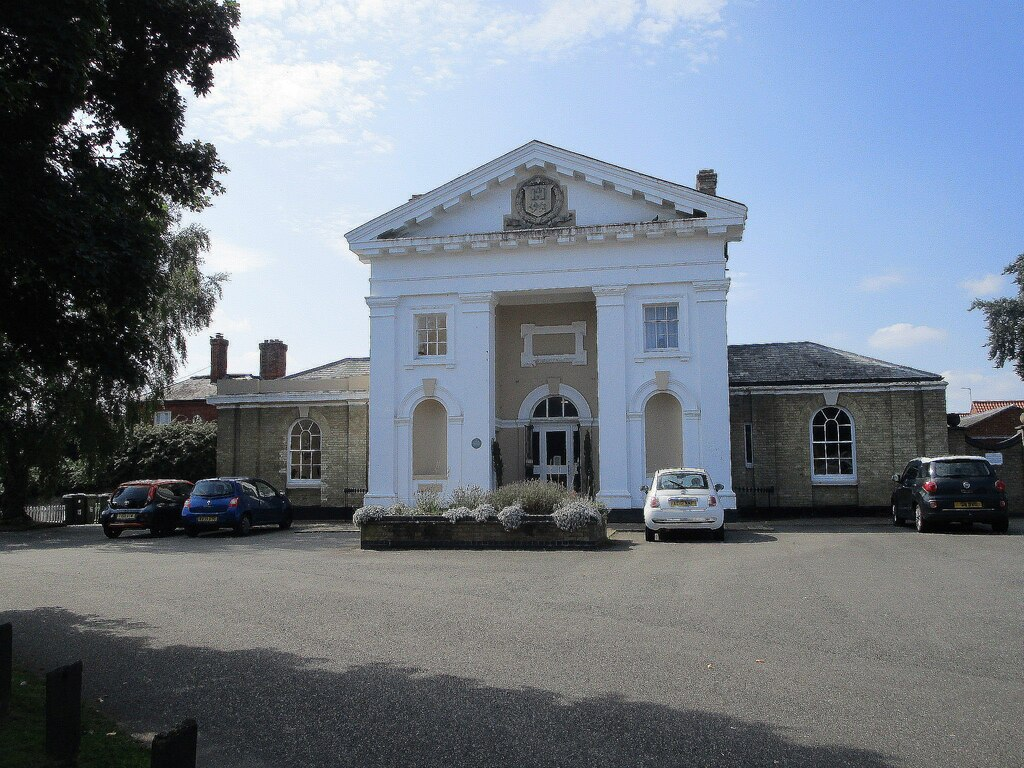
- The building in 2021

- Shown in Norfolk
- 52.6449°N 0.6904°E
- Location: Whitecross Road, Swaffham

History
- Built: 1839

Site notes
- Architect: John Brown
- Architectural style: Neoclassical style

Listed Building – Grade II
- Official name: The Shirehall, 1–16 Beech Close
- Designated: 17 January 1973
- Reference no.: 1269667

Swaffham Town Hall is a judicial building in Whitecross Road in Swaffham, a town in Norfolk, in England. The building, which is now in residential use, is a Grade II listed building.

== History ==
The building was commissioned by the local justices and financed by public subscription. The site they selected was occupied at the rear by the local prison, which had been erected in 1798, but there was space available at the front of the site.

The new building was designed by the county surveyor for Norfolk, John Brown, in the neoclassical style, built in brick with a stucco finish and was completed in 1839. The design involved a symmetrical main frontage of five pays facing onto Whitecross Road. The central section of three bays featured a large portico formed by four full-height Doric order pilasters supporting an entablature and a modillioned pediment. The central bay contained a round-headed doorway with an architrave and a keystone and an oblong panel at first floor level, all within a full-height recess. The outer bays of the central section contained niches on the ground floor and sash windows on the first floor. The single-storey wings were fenestrated by round headed windows. The principal room was the courtroom where the quarter sessions were held; petty sessions were also held every Saturday. The architectural historian, Nikolaus Pevsner, criticized the design of the portico saying that it was "almost too big".

Following the formation of Norfolk County Council in 1889, the pediment was adapted to accommodate a carved coat of arms of the county council in the tympanum. In 1894, the local urban sanitary district board was replaced by a new urban district council. The new council established its offices at the Shirehall but, in the early 1950s, civic leaders decided to relocate to a building at No. 4 London Street, which then became Swaffham Town Hall.

The building continued to serve in a judicial capacity until the court hearings relocated elsewhere in the county and the building was converted into apartments in the late 1980s.
