= John Brown (architect) =

John Brown (1805–1876) was a 19th-century architect working in Norwich, England. His buildings include churches and workhouses.

== Life ==
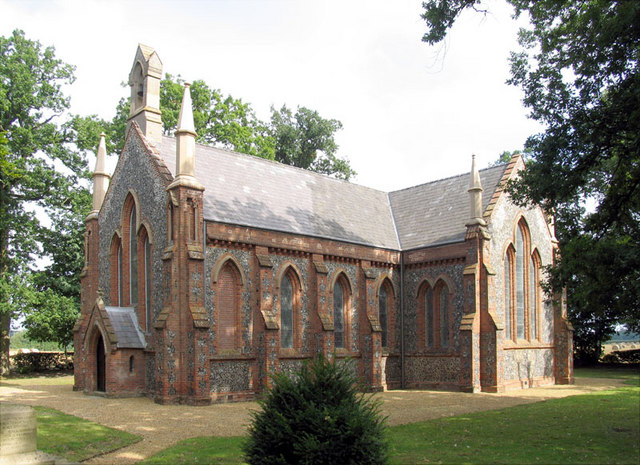
All Saints, Hainford, Norfolk (1838–40).

He was the pupil of the architect William Brown of Ipswich, a close relative. He was, along with his two sons, the surveyor for Norwich Cathedral, where his work there included a restoration of the crossing tower, undertaken during the 1830s. He was appointed county surveyor for Norfolk in 1835.

== List of works ==
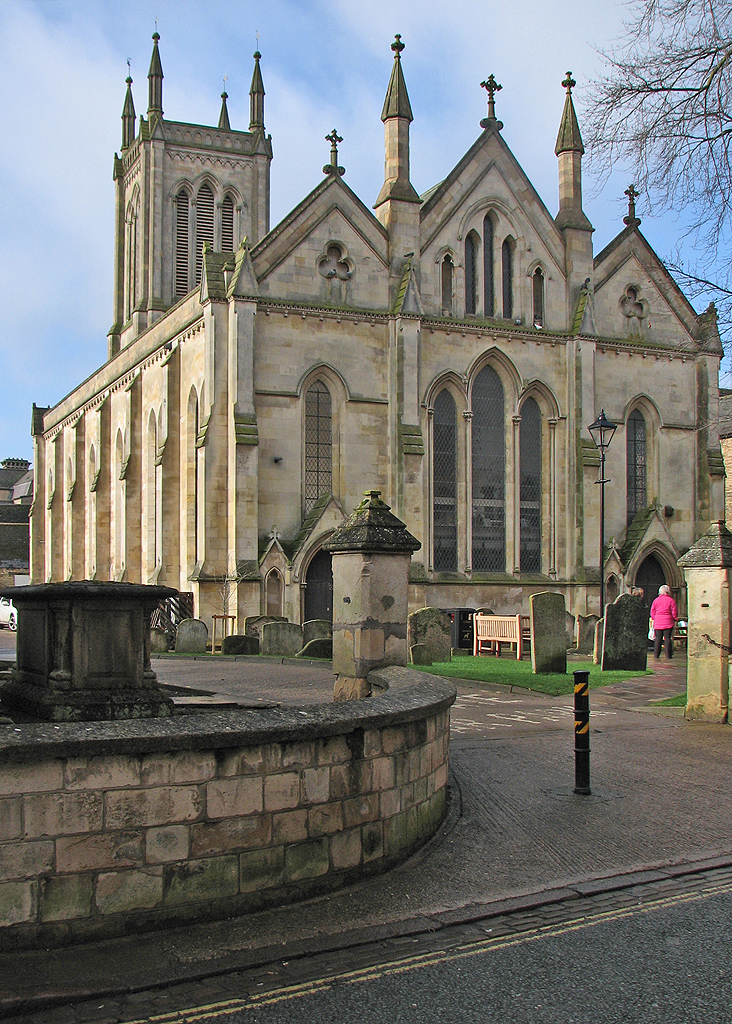
St Michael's Church, Stamford, Lincolnshire

- Christ Church, Greenwich, Greater London (built 1847-49)
- St Margaret's Church, Lee, Greater London (built 1839–41)
- St Michael's Church, Stamford, Lincolnshire (built 1835–36)
- Church of St Peter & St Paul, Bergh Apton, Norfolk (built 1838)
- Corn Exchange, Fakenham, Norfolk (built 1855)
- Workhouse, Great Yarmouth, Norfolk (built 1838, later used as a hospital)
- All Saints' Church, Hainford, Norfolk (built 1838-40)
- St Mark's Church, Lakenham, Norwich, (built 1844)
- Workhouse, Lingwood, Norfolk (built 1837)
- Christ Church, New Catton, Norwich, (built 1841)
- St James Mill, Norwich, (built 1836-37)
- Shirehall, Swaffham, Norfolk (built 1839)
- St Matthew's Church, Thorpe Hamlet, Norfolk (built 1851)
- St Peter's Church, Lowestoft, Suffolk (built 1833, demolished 1974)
- Workhouse, Sudbury, Suffolk (built 1836)

== Sources ==
Pevsner, Nikolaus (1962). North-East Norfolk and Norwich. The Buildings of England. Harmondsworth: Penguin Books.
