= Swaffham =

Town in Norfolk, England

Coordinates: 52.652893°N 0.684285°E

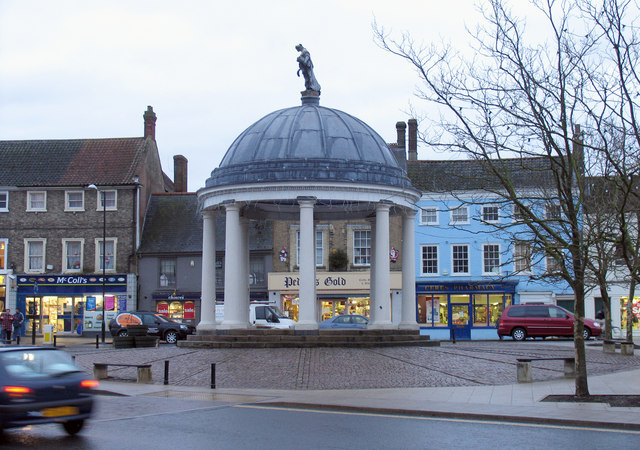
- The Buttercross Swaffham market place

- Location within Norfolk
- Area: 29.6 km^{2} (11.4 sq mi)
- Population: 8,434 (2021)
  - Density: 285/km^{2} (740/sq mi)
- OS grid reference: TF815095
- Civil parish: Swaffham
- District: Breckland
- Shire county: Norfolk
- Region: East
- Country: England
- Sovereign state: United Kingdom
- Post town: SWAFFHAM
- Postcode district: PE37
- Dialling code: 01760
- Police: Norfolk
- Fire: Norfolk
- Ambulance: East of England
- UK Parliament: South West Norfolk
- Website: Town council

Swaffham (/ˈswɒfəm/; "swoffum") is a market town and civil parish in the Breckland District and English county of Norfolk. It is situated 12 miles (19 kilometres) east of King's Lynn and 31 miles (50 kilometres) west of Norwich.

The civil parish has an area of 11.42 mi^{2} (29.6 km^{2}) and in the 2001 census had a population of 6,935 in 3,130 households, which increased to 7,258, in 3,258 households, at the 2011 census. By the time the 2021 census took place, the population had jumped to 8434. For the purposes of local government, the parish falls within the district of Breckland.

== History ==
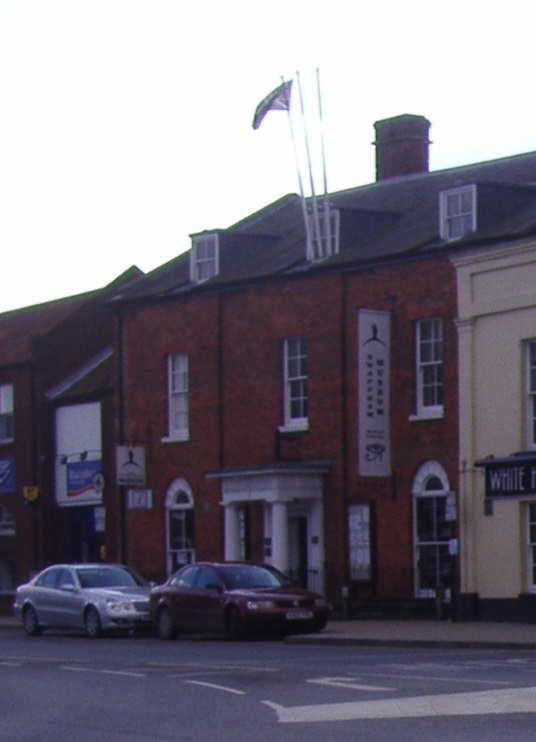
Swaffham Town Hall

The name of the town derives from the Old English Swǣfa hām = "the homestead of the Swabians"; some of them presumably came with the Angles and Saxons.

By the 14th and 15th centuries Swaffham had an emerging sheep and wool industry. As a result of this prosperity, the town has a large market place. The market cross here was built by George Walpole, 3rd Earl of Orford and presented to the town in 1783. On the top is the statue of Ceres, the Roman goddess of the harvest. The former Corn Hall, which was designed by Mathias Goggs, was completed in 1858.

About 8 km to the north of Swaffham can be found the ruins of the formerly important Castle Acre Priory and Castle Acre Castle.

On the west side of Swaffham Market Place are several old buildings which for many years housed the historic Hamond's Grammar School, as a plaque on the wall of the main building explains. The Hamond's Grammar School building latterly came to serve as the sixth form for the Hamond's High School, but that use has since ceased. Harry Carter, the grammar school's art teacher of the 1960s, was responsible for a great number of the carved village signs that are now found in many of Norfolk's towns and villages, including Swaffham's own sign commemorating the legendary Pedlar of Swaffham, which is in the corner of the market place just opposite the old school's gates. Carter was a distant cousin of the archaeologist and egyptologist Howard Carter who spent much of his childhood in the town.

The Swaffham Museum is a small, independent social history museum for Swaffham and the surrounding villages in Norfolk from the Stone Age to the modern. It has five galleries exhibiting local history and local geology as well as an Egyptology room about Howard Carter and the Ancient Egyptians, celebrating the centenary year of Howard Carter discovering the Tomb of Tutankhamun in 1922.

Swaffham was struck by a tornado measuring F1 on the Fujita scale and T2 on the TORRO scale on 23 November 1981 during the 1981 United Kingdom tornado outbreak.

== Folklore ==
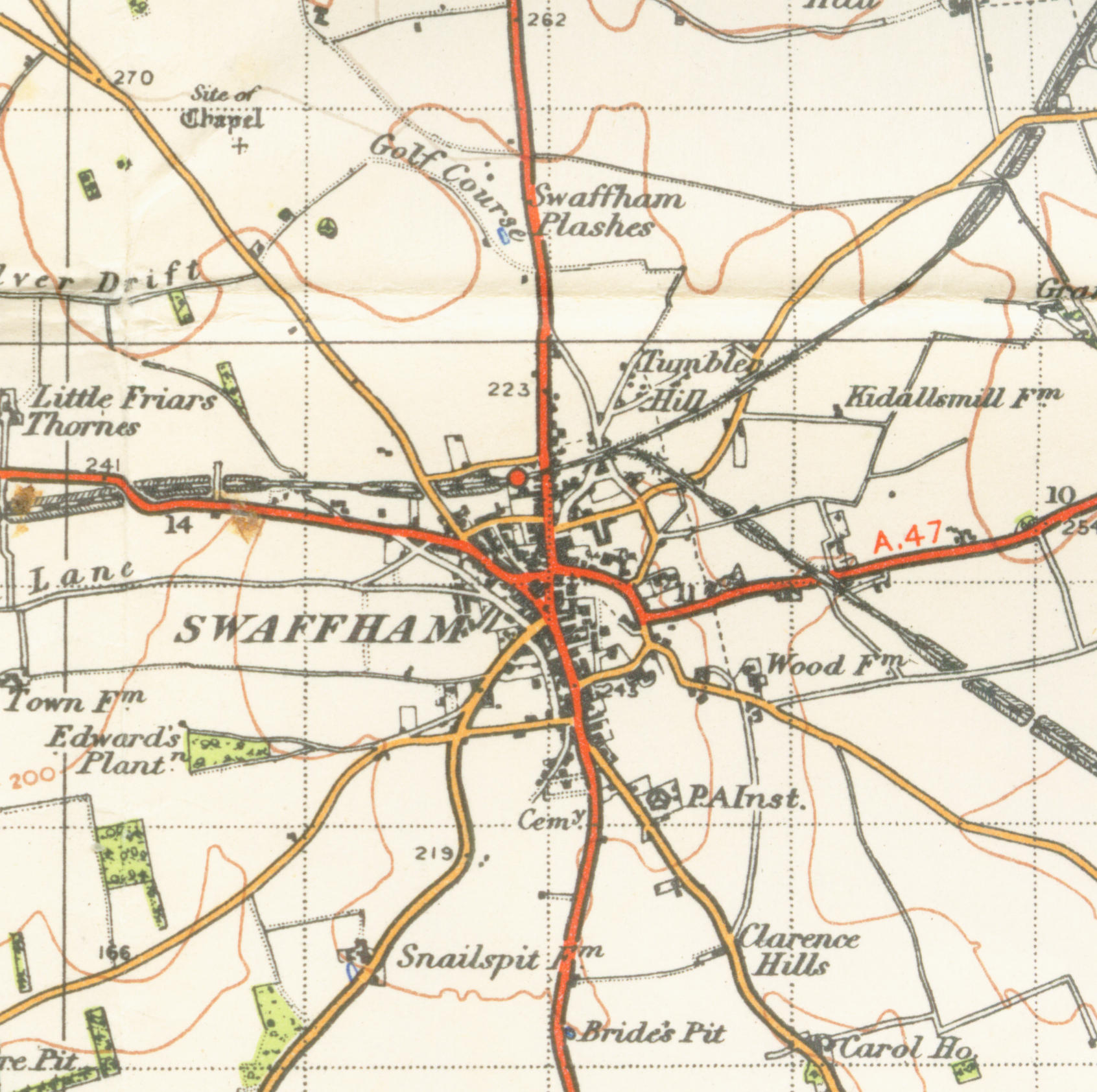
A map of Swaffham from 1946

Swaffham is one of the many locations for The Man Who Became Rich through a Dream folk tale (Aarne-Thompson type 1645). The tale tells of a pedlar from Swaffham who dreamed for several consecutive nights that if he waited on London Bridge he would eventually hear good news. He travelled to London, and waited for several days on the bridge. Eventually a shopkeeper asked him why he was waiting, and the man told of his dream. The shopkeeper laughed, and replied that he often dreamed that if he went to a certain orchard in Swaffham and started digging, he would find buried treasure. The pedlar returned to Swaffham, and found the treasure.

In medieval folklore, a black, hairy dog called the Black Shuck was rumoured to have wandered the three settlements of Swaffham, Castle Acre, and Great Cressingham, ambushing merchants who were on their way to large towns to sell their goods. There are still rumours of a puma-like black cat wandering around Norfolk and Cambridgeshire.

== Parish church ==
The church of Saint Peter and Saint Paul is one of only a few churches that have angels carved in wood instead of stone around the top of the walls. The current building, dating from 1454, is built on the foundation of the original church. A wood carving of the "Pedlar of Swaffham" is also in the church.

== Transport ==
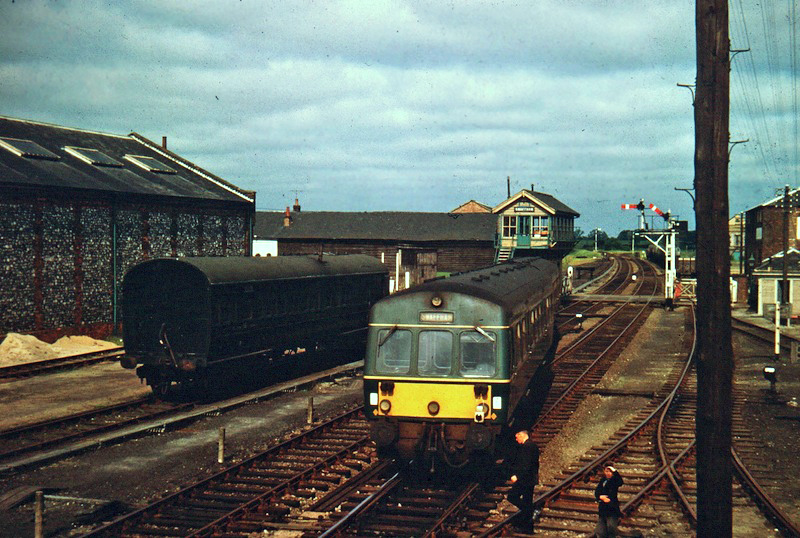
Swaffham railway station, when part of the Eastern Region of British Rail

The nearest railway stations to Swaffham are at King's Lynn and Downham Market, on the Fen line. There are regular services to Ely, Cambridge and London King's Cross, operated by Great Northern.

Until 1968, the town was served by Swaffham railway station on the Great Eastern Railway line from King's Lynn. Just after Swaffham, the line split into two: one branch headed south to Thetford and the other east towards Dereham. The lines were all closed as part of the Beeching cuts, though the possibility of rebuilding a direct rail link from Norwich to King's Lynn, via Swaffham, is raised occasionally.

The east–west A47 Birmingham to Great Yarmouth road now bypasses the town, using a northerly bypass opened in 1981. The A1065 Mildenhall to Fakenham road still passes through the centre of the town on its north–south route, intersecting with the A47 at a grade separated junction north of the town.

First Eastern Counties' Excel bus routes provide a regular public transport link through Swaffham between Dereham and King's Lynn. Most services continue east to Norwich and west to Peterborough.

== Listed buildings ==
Swaffham contains 103 listed buildings. Of these:

- 2 are grade I
- 2 are grade II*
- 99 are grade II

== Media ==
Local news and television programmes are provided by BBC East and ITV Anglia. Television signals are received from either the Tacolneston or Sandy Heath TV transmitters

Local radio stations are BBC Radio Norfolk on 104.4 FM, Heart East on 102.4 FM, Greatest Hits Radio Norfolk & North Suffolk on 96.7 FM, Amber Radio, Radio West Norfolk and KLFM Radio.

The town's local newspaper is the Watton and Swaffham Times.

== Sport and leisure ==
Swaffham has a Non-League football club, Swaffham Town, which plays at Shoemakers Lane.

Swaffham Raceway, a former greyhound track, hosts stock car racing.

== Wind turbines and Green Britain Centre ==
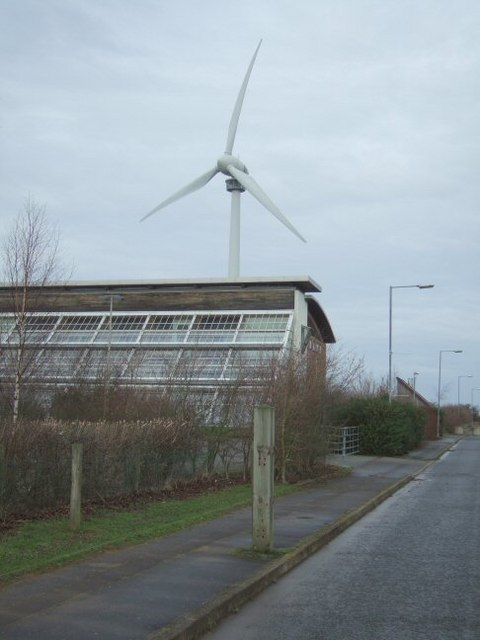
The Green Britain Centre in 2006

Today the town is known for the presence of two large Enercon E-66 wind turbines. The first of these began operation in 1999 and the second in 2003. Together they generate more than three megawatts. The first of the wind turbines to be constructed was an Enercon E66/1500 with 1.5 MW generation capacity, 67 metres nacelle height and 66 metres rotor diameter. It was also built with an observation deck just below the nacelle which was open for the public to climb during the 2000s and 2010s, the only wind turbine in the world to have such a facility. These two turbines have since been joined by an independent development of a further eight turbines at the village of North Pickenham, three miles (five kilometres) from Swaffham.

The turbines were originally associated with the EcoTech Centre, a visitor centre which was opened in 1999. The centre hosted the 2008 British BASE jumping championships; contestants jumped from the roof of the observation deck. In 2008 the energy company Ecotricity took over the management of the site and in 2012 the visitor centre was renamed the Green Britain Centre. The centre provided a venue for school trips and event hire, and had educational displays focussing on sustainability in food, energy and transport. The height of the attraction's popularity was in 2016, when 22,000 people visited the centre and 8,000 climbed the turbine.

In June 2018 it was announced that the centre had closed for financial reasons and that Ecotricity intended to hand the building back to Breckland District Council (BDC). The council subsequently put it up for rent or sale and discussed exchanging it with Swaffham Town Council in return for 5 acres (2.0 ha) of building land. A proposal to convert the building into a leisure centre was considered by BDC but ultimately abandoned. In 2021 the building was sold to manufacturer Flexion Global for use as their headquarters. Shortly after the sale, Swaffham Town Council gave BCD a parcel of land next to the centre on which BDC intends to build a leisure centre.

== Climate ==
As with the rest of the British Isles and East Anglia, Swaffham experiences a maritime climate with cool summers and mild winters. The nearest Met Office weather station to provide local climate data is RAF Marham, about 5 1/2 miles (9 km) west of the town centre. Temperature extremes in the Swaffham-Marham area range from 34.8 °C (94.6 °F) in August 1990, down to −16.7 °C (1.9 °F) during February 1956. The highest and lowest temperatures reported in the past decade are 34.6 °C (94.3 °F) during August 2003, and −10.3 °C (13.5 °F) during January 2010.

Climate data for RAF Marham (1991–2020 normals)
Month	Jan	Feb	Mar	Apr	May	Jun	Jul	Aug	Sep	Oct	Nov	Dec	Year
Mean daily maximum °C (°F)	7.2 (45.0)	8.0 (46.4)	10.7 (51.3)	13.9 (57.0)	17.1 (62.8)	19.9 (67.8)	22.5 (72.5)	22.3 (72.1)	19.2 (66.6)	14.9 (58.8)	10.4 (50.7)	7.5 (45.5)	14.5 (58.1)
Mean daily minimum °C (°F)	1.1 (34.0)	1.1 (34.0)	2.6 (36.7)	4.5 (40.1)	7.4 (45.3)	10.4 (50.7)	12.4 (54.3)	12.3 (54.1)	10.1 (50.2)	7.3 (45.1)	3.7 (38.7)	1.4 (34.5)	6.2 (43.2)
Average rainfall mm (inches)	55.3 (2.18)	43.2 (1.70)	43.5 (1.71)	43.5 (1.71)	48.2 (1.90)	62.4 (2.46)	57.8 (2.28)	62.1 (2.44)	55.4 (2.18)	66.4 (2.61)	63.3 (2.49)	59.3 (2.33)	660.3 (26.00)
Average rainy days (≥ 1 mm)	11.6	10.3	9.4	9.1	8.6	10.0	9.3	9.4	8.9	11.0	12.3	11.7	121.6
Mean monthly sunshine hours	56.9	78.2	112.0	169.1	209.4	194.0	211.3	192.2	145.2	107.6	68.9	51.5	1,596.1
Source: Met Office

== Kingdom (TV series) ==
In the summer of 2006, location filming was done in the town for the ITV1 series Kingdom, starring Stephen Fry. In Kingdom the town is called Market Shipborough. The pub the Startled Duck in the TV series is better known as the Greyhound Inn, in which the Earl of Orford created the first coursing club open to the public, in 1776. Peter Kingdom's office is Oakleigh House, near the town square (formerly the house of the Head Master of Hamond's Grammar School), with the coastal scenes filmed at Wells-next-the-Sea on the north Norfolk coast.

== Notable people ==
- Dominic Byrne, newsreader on The Chris Moyles Show
- Michael Carroll, lottery winner
- Howard Carter, archaeologist who discovered the tomb of Tutankhamun
- Christopher Dawes, author of Rat Scabies and The Holy Grail
- Stephen Fry, actor and writer
- W. E. Johns, author of the "Biggles" books
- William Methwold (1590–1653), born South Pickenham, East India Company merchant
- John Dugmore of Swaffham (1793–1871), draughtsman and grand-tourist
- Hilda Plowright (1890-1973), actress
- Phyllis Broughton (1860–1926) actress, spent her childhood here.
- Sir Arthur Knyvet Wilson, (1842–1921), First Sea Lord
