= Surrey House =

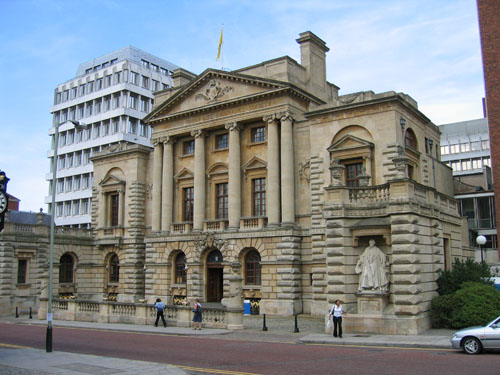

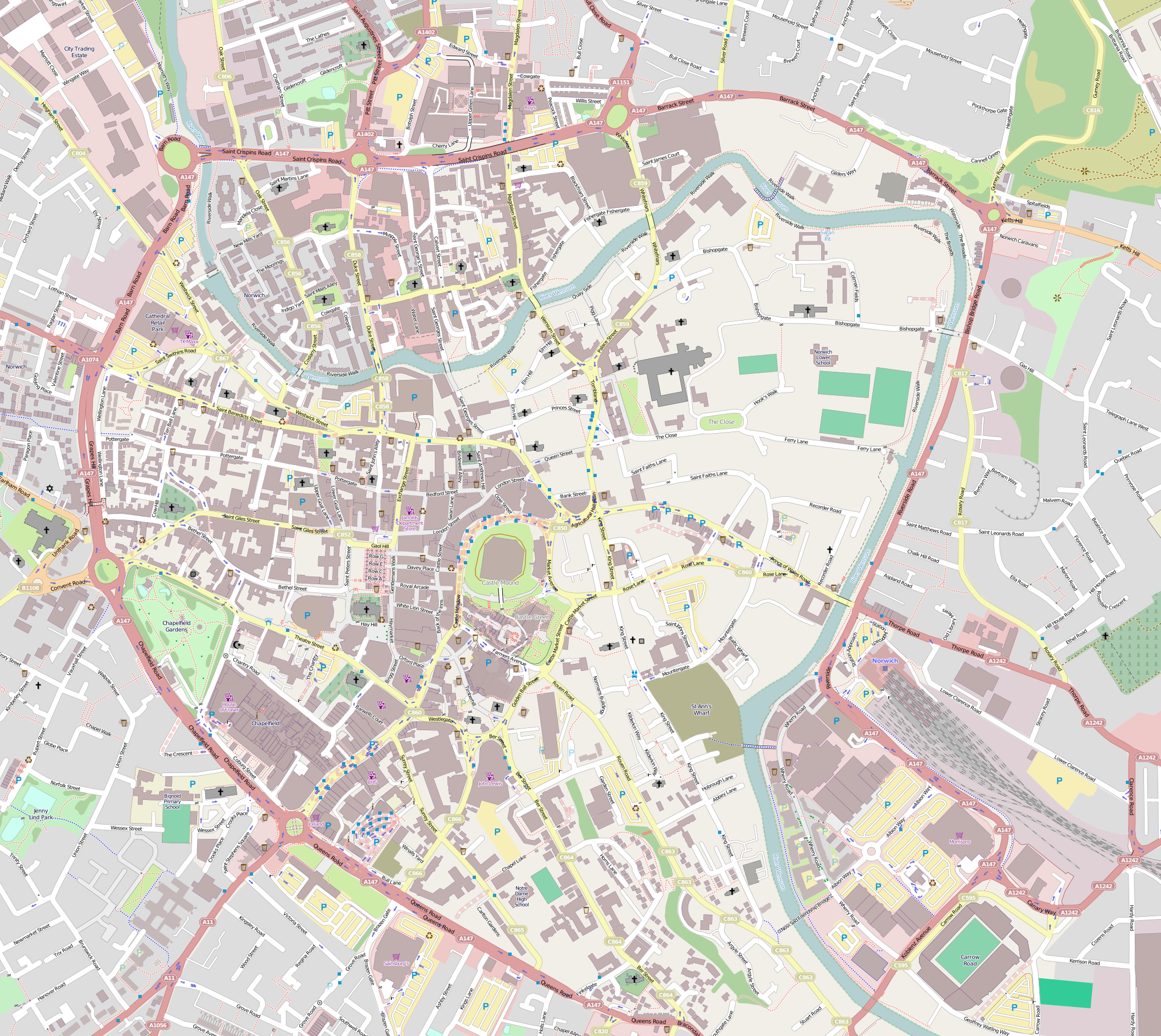
- Location within Norwich Location within Norfolk
- 52.6246°N 1.2944°E
- Type: house
- Location: Norwich

History
- Built: 1900 onwards

Site notes
- Architect: George Skipper
- Architectural style: Edwardian
- Owner: Aviva

Listed Building – Grade I
- Official name: Norwich Union Offices
- Designated: 5 June 1972
- Reference no.: 1210553

Surrey House, in Norwich, England, is the historic home of the insurance company Aviva (formerly Norwich Union) and a Grade I listed building.

== History ==
It is an example of Edwardian architecture designed by George Skipper and built between 1900 and 1912. Skipper was commissioned by The Norwich Union Life Insurance Society's directors to produce a 'splendid yet functional office space', incorporating Greek influences and the themes of insurance, protection and wellbeing, to reassure policyholders of the company's strength and prosperity.

The building has a Palladian exterior and an interior adorned with 15 varieties of marble, classically inspired frescos and a glass atrium. It also contains unusual items such as an 'air fountain' and a chiming skeleton clock made for the Great Exhibition of 1851.

The Marble Hall, intriguingly, was not part of Skipper's initial design plans; its creation was the result of an unexpected twist of fate. In 1895, the construction of Westminster Cathedral had begun, its interior famously adorned with marble. By the time construction on Surrey House commenced, the Cathedral was on the verge of completion, albeit with costs exceeding the initial budget. According to canon law, a church cannot be consecrated until all its debts are cleared, necessitating budget cuts. Skipper learned about a batch of marble, initially intended for the Cathedral but now available at a significant discount. He successfully convinced the Norwich Union board to acquire it, leading to a revision of his original plans. This decision has left us with the historical marvel of the Marble Hall, a legacy that continues to be admired today.

It is one of the Norwich 12 buildings.
