= Norwich 12 =

Heritage preservation initiative in Norwich, England

Coordinates: 52°37′44.4936″N 1°17′32.59″E

Norwich 12 Logo

Norwich 12 was an initiative by the Norwich Heritage Economic and Regeneration Trust (HERT) to develop 12 of Norwich's most iconic buildings into an integrated family of heritage attractions to act as an international showcase of English urban and cultural development over the last 1,000 years.

Norwich HERT initially secured £1 million from HM Treasury's 'Invest to Save' budget to run the program.

The 12 buildings are a collection of architectural styles that span across the Norman, medieval, Georgian, Victorian, and modern eras.

The program was launched in the summer of 2008.

== The Norwich 12 Buildings ==
=== Norwich Castle (1067–1075) ===
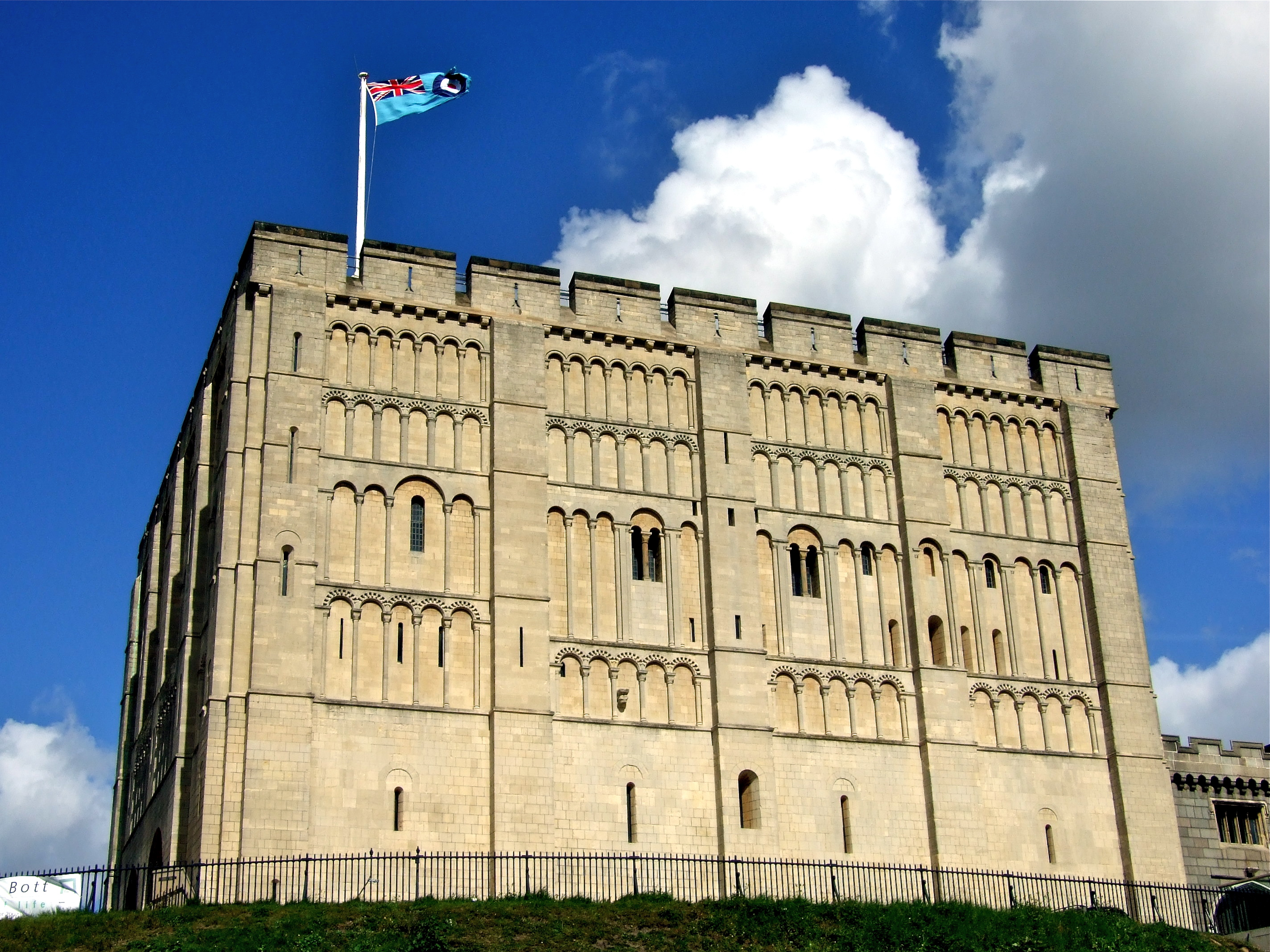
Norwich Castle

Norwich Castle is a Norman building, originally built as a royal palace for William the Conqueror at a time when most buildings were small, wooden structures. The huge stone keep was a symbol of the king's power.

The castle mound (motte) is the largest in the country, and from the 14th to the 19th century, the keep was used as a county gaol.

The castle was converted into a museum in 1894.

=== Norwich Cathedral (1096–1145) ===
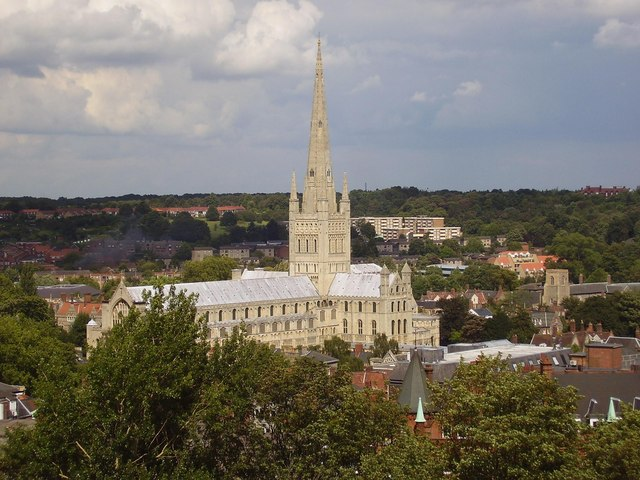
Norwich Cathedral

Most of Norwich Cathedral's Norman architecture is still intact, and it forms one of the most complete examples of the Romanesque style in Europe. Like the castle, the cathedral's scale signified the power and permanence of the Norman invaders.

Caen stone was transported from Normandy, and the immense building project required an army of masons, craftsmen, glaziers, and labourers. Some of the original Norman wall painting survives in the Cathedral's Jesus Chapel and the presbytery.

Norwich Cathedral has the highest Norman tower (40 meters) and the largest monastic cloisters in England, as well as a unique collection of medieval roof carvings.

A new Hostry Visitor and Education Centre, built within the footprint of the medieval Hostry, opened in 2009.

=== The Great Hospital (1249) ===
Norwich's Great Hospital has been in continuous use as a caring institution since it was founded for the care of poor chaplains in the 13th century. The six-acre complex of buildings and extensive archives provide a living history of the last 750 years.

The site includes the ancient parish church of St Helen and Eagle Ward with its lavishly decorated 'eagle ceiling', originally the chancel of the church. There is also a refectory, cloisters, 15th and 16th-century wings, 19th-century almshouses, the Birkbeck Hall, an example of Victorian and Edwardian Gothic revival architecture, and St Helen's House, built by Thomas Ivory in the 18th century.

Today, the hospital provides sheltered housing and a residential care home.

=== The Halls: St Andrew's and Blackfriars' (1307–1470) ===
St Andrew's Hall is the centrepiece of several flint buildings known as The Halls, which form the most complete friary complex surviving in England. The first Dominican Black Friars' priory was destroyed by fire, and St Andrew's Hall formed the nave of the new church, completed in 1449.

During the Reformation, the site was saved by the City Corporation, which bought it from the king for use as a 'common hall.' Since then, the complex has been used for worship, as a mint, and as a workhouse.

Today the two halls, crypt, chapel, and cloisters host conferences, fairs, weddings, and concerts.

=== The Guildhall (1407–1424) ===
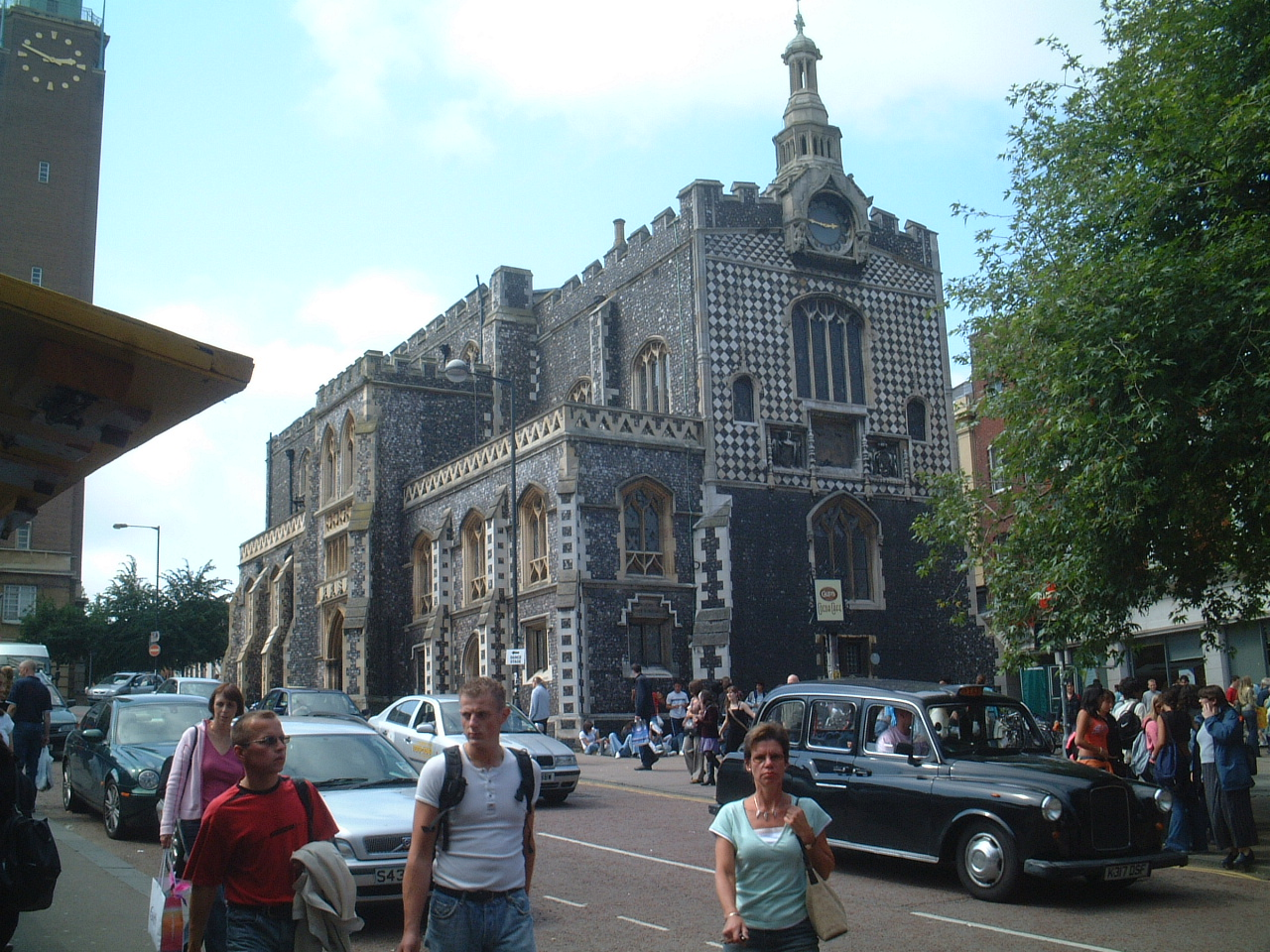
Norwich Guildhall

The design and size of Norwich Guildhall were significant features that reflected the city's economic status in medieval times as one of the wealthiest provincial cities in England.

The building represents the growing economic and political power of the new ruling elite that was emerging—wealthy freemen who were merchants and traders.

In 1404 Norwich was given more self-governing powers, and the Guildhall was built to house the various civic assemblies, councils, and courts that regulated its citizens' lives.

Evidence of these historic functions, which continued until the 20th century, can still be seen. Other parts of the building are in commercial use.

=== Dragon Hall (1427–1430) ===
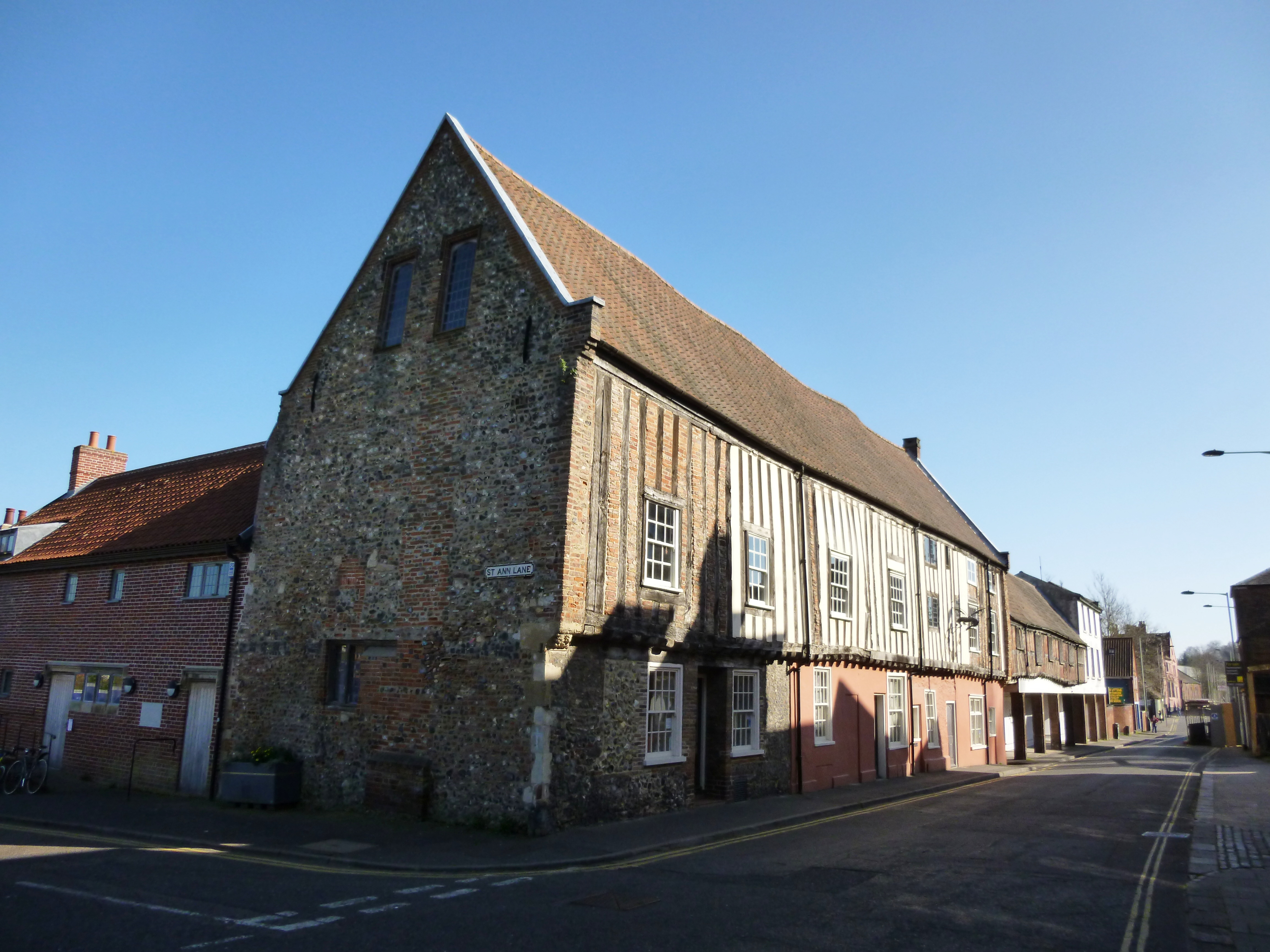
Dragon Hall

Dragon Hall is a medieval trading hall built by Robert Toppes, a wealthy local merchant, for his business. The first floor of the 27-metre-tall timber-framed hall has a crown-post roof with a carved dragon, which gives the building its name.

After Toppes' death, the building was converted for domestic use and then, in the 19th century, subdivided into shops, a pub, and tenements. The great crown-post roof was hidden from view for many years and only rediscovered in the 1980s.

Dragon Hall then became a heritage attraction open to visitors and a venue for weddings, private and corporate functions, and performances.

It has been home to the National Centre for Writing since 2015, hosting events and writer development programmes, as well as public tours and drop-in visits.

=== The Assembly House (1754–1755) ===
The Assembly House is a Georgian building designed by the architect Thomas Ivory. It incorporates the original layout of a previous building, the medieval college of St Mary in the Fields.

When it opened, the Assembly House was used as a centre for entertainment and assemblies for the local gentry. During its long history, it has hosted a waxworks exhibition by Madame Tussaud, a concert by the composer Franz Liszt, and many balls.

Today the rooms appear almost exactly as they did at the height of the Regency period and are used for exhibitions, concerts, conferences, and weddings.

=== St James Mill (1836–1839) ===
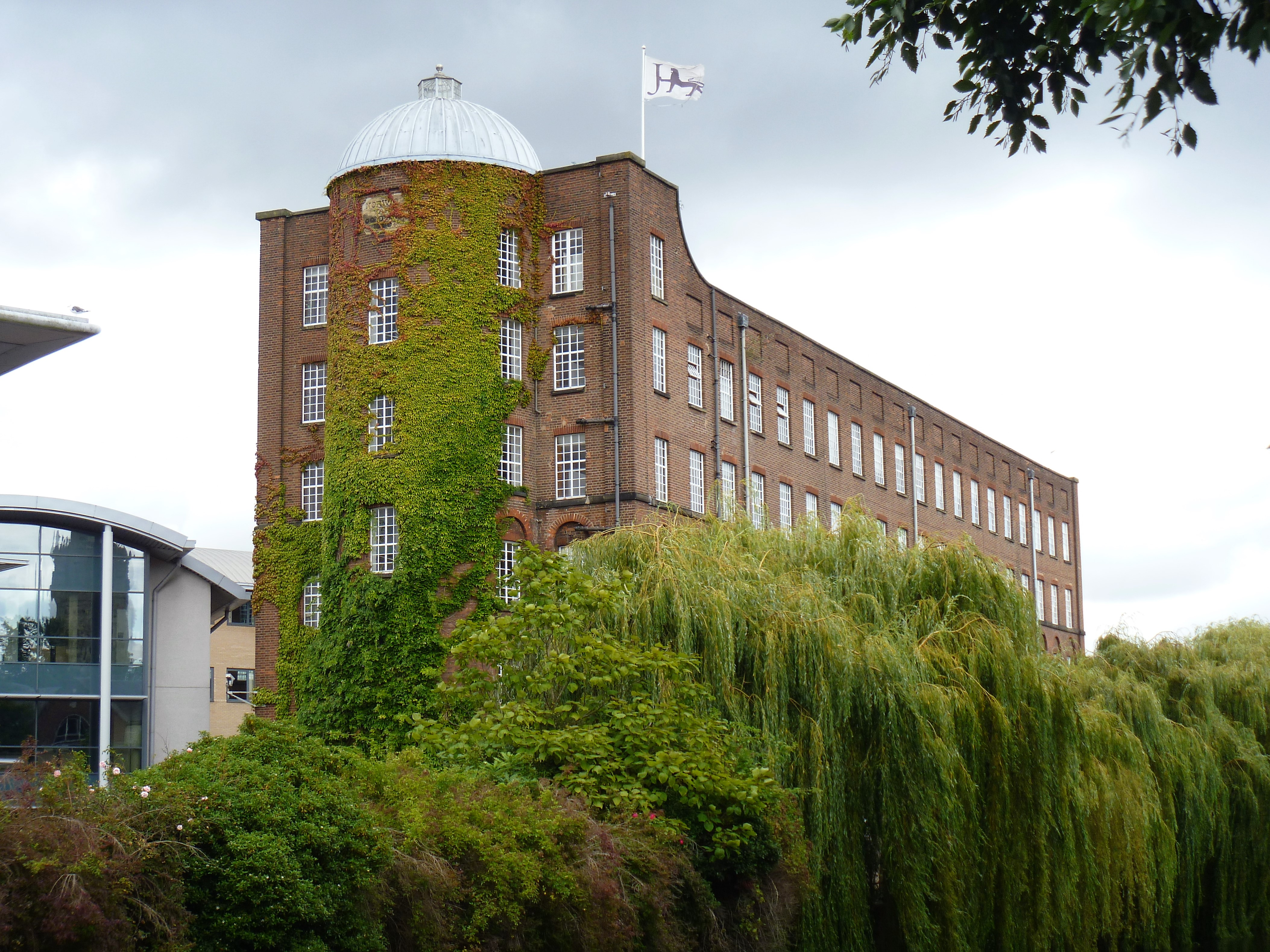
St James Mill

St James Mill is a notable example of an English industrial mill, located in an area that may not be typically associated with this type of industry. It was built on a site occupied by the White Friars (Carmelites) in the 13th century, and an original arch and undercroft survive.

When the local textile trade went into decline, St James Mill was bought by Jarrold & Sons Ltd. for use by its printing department in 1902. The building was subsequently leased to Caley's, the chocolate manufacturer, and sold to the government as a training factory for war veterans in 1920.

Jarrolds bought back the mill in 1933, and today it is a private office complex. The John Jarrold Printing Museum, which is open most Wednesdays, is situated behind the mill.

=== The Cathedral of St John the Baptist (1884–1910) ===
The Cathedral of St John the Baptist is an example of 19th-century Gothic revival architecture. In the 19th century, Catholicism was once again allowed to be practiced publicly, and the Cathedral of St John the Baptist was built as a gift to the city by Henry Fitzalan Howard, 15th Duke of Norfolk.

The cathedral was designed in the Early English style by George Gilbert Scott Junior and features 19th-century stained glass, Frosterley Marble, and stone carving.

The cathedral also incorporates the Narthex, a new visitor centre.

=== Surrey House (1900–1912) ===
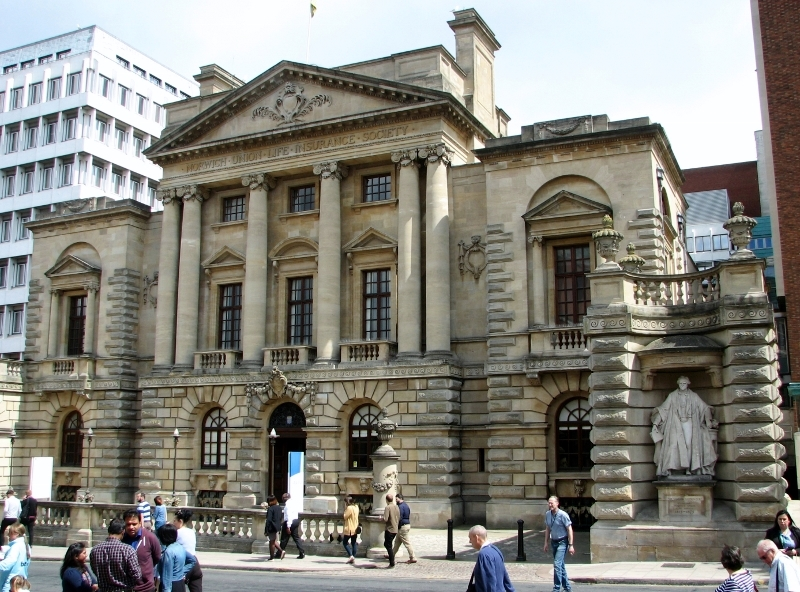
Surrey House

Surrey House, the historic home of Aviva (formerly Norwich Union), is a spectacular piece of Edwardian architecture designed by George Skipper. He was commissioned by The Norwich Union Life Insurance Society's directors to produce a 'splendid yet functional office space', incorporating Greek influences and the themes of insurance, protection, and wellbeing, to reassure policyholders of the company's strength and prosperity.

The building has a commanding Palladian exterior and an interior adorned with 15 varieties of marble, classically inspired frescos, and a glass atrium. It also contains unusual items such as an 'air fountain' and a chiming skeleton clock made for the Great Exhibition of 1851.

=== City Hall (1936–1938) ===
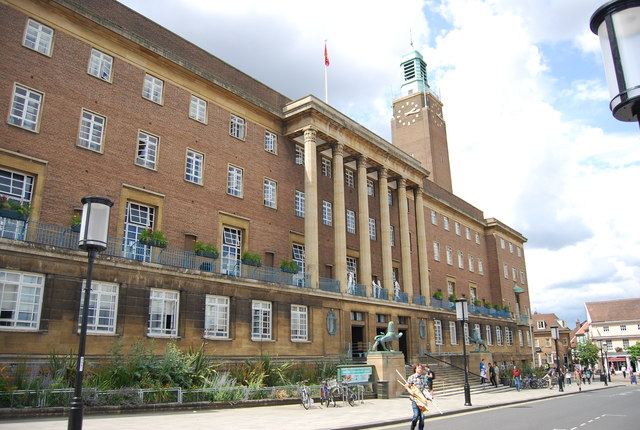
City Hall

Norwich City Hall was completed in 1938 when the Guildhall and existing municipal offices could no longer accommodate the growth in local government duties.

The city council consulted the Royal Institute of British Architects (RIBA) and organised an architectural competition to design a new municipal building.

City Hall has an art deco interior, a top-floor cupola, mahogany panelling, and one of the longest balconies in England.

=== The Forum (1999–2001) ===
The Forum was funded by the Millennium Commission with matching support from Norfolk County Council, Norwich City Council and the business community.

An example of post-war architecture, the building houses the Norfolk & Norwich Millennium Library and 2nd Air Division Memorial Library, Norwich Tourist Information Centre, a café and PizzaExpress restaurant and is home to BBC East's headquarters.

In 2009 it opened a series of community facilities, including Fusion, Europe's largest permanent digital gallery with free public access and a state-of-the-art auditorium. Different every day, The Forum also hosts a year-round line-up of free and ticketed events, exhibitions and entertainment.

== Exploring the 12 ==
While not all of the Norwich 12 attractions are open to the public, a main focus of the project was to improve accessibility to each of the sites.

All 12 can be explored by means of guided walks and tours, exhibitions and music/performances at the venues, or via heritage interpretation leaflets, signage, websites and guidebooks.

=== Norwich 12 totems ===
Heritage interpretation totems were installed beside each of the 12 buildings. These detail the key names and dates associated with the buildings and also contain bluetooth technology capable of delivering additional heritage information to mobile phones.

== SHAPING 24 ==
SHAPING 24

Ghent 12 Logo

SHAPING 24 – Strategies for Heritage Access Pathways in Norwich and Ghent – was an award-winning cultural heritage tourism initiative, also coordinated by Norwich HEART, in conjunction with Stad Gent, that links together the Norwich 12 buildings, with 12 heritage sites in Ghent in Belgium.

The project sought to increase awareness of the longstanding historical links between the East of England and the Low Countries.

The SHAPING 24 project was a winner of the 2014 European Union Prize for Cultural Heritage / Europa Nostra Awards for Education, Training and Awareness-Raising.

The SHAPING 24 project was part-funded by the European Regional Development Fund from the European Union's INTERREG IVA 2 Mers Seas Zeeen Cross-border Cooperation Programme 2007–2013.

=== Gent: 12 x erfgoed ===
The 12 heritage sites in Ghent are:

- St Bavo's Abbey
- St Peter's Abbey
- St Bavo's Cathedral
- Castle of the Counts
- St Nicolas' Church
- Beguinages
  - Lange Violettestraat
  - Sint-Amandsberg
- Bijloke Monastery Site
- The Belfry
- Ghent City Hall
- Hotels
  - Hotel Clemmen
  - Hotel d'Hane-Steenhuyse
- Museum of Fine Arts
- Book Tower
