= Mireille Silcoff =

Canadian author, journalist, and editor (born 1973)

Mireille Silcoff (born February 1, 1973, in Montreal) is a Canadian author, journalist, and editor. She is the author of four books, including the work of fiction Chez L'arabe (Anansi).

== Biography ==
Silcoff was a longstanding columnist with the National Post and is a contributor to publications including The New York Times Magazine, The Guardian, and Ha'aretz. She is the founding editor of Guilt & Pleasure Quarterly, "a magazine of new Jewish writing and ideas" (2005-2007), and the founder of a Toronto-based discussion salon (2004-2006) that was connected to the magazine. In 2006, Silcoff stepped away from all journalism, magazine work, and public appearances after developing the rare neurological syndrome, chronic cerebrospinal fluid leaks. After years of being bedridden, she began writing again for the National Post in 2010 and for The New York Times Magazine in 2011. The partially autobiographical Chez L'arabe describes her cloistered world of severe illness.

From the age of 19 to 24, Silcoff was a music journalist specializing in nightclub culture. Up until 2001, she published under the pen name Mireille Silcott, authoring two books under that name, Rave America (ECW Press, 1998) and The Book of E (Omnibus Press, 2000, co-authored with Push).

== Chez L'arabe ==
The short story collection Chez L'arabe was named one of The Globe 100: The best books of 2014 by The Globe and Mail. Reviews were unanimously strong throughout Canada and internationally. It was named one of the best books of the year by The Montreal Gazette, CBC Books, The Walrus, and others. Chez L'arabe won prizes, including the Canadian Jewish Literary Award for Short Story Collection and second prize for the Danuta Gleed Award for the Short Story; it was also long-listed for the Frank O'Connor International Prize for the Short Story. It was voted Canada's favourite short story collection of 2014 on CBC Canada Writes. The collection came out in French translation in the fall of 2016, published by Marchand de feuilles. Individual short stories from the collection were published on Electric Literature and Five Dials.
