= Pedlar of Swaffham =

English folktale from Swaffham, Norfolk

The Pedlar of Swaffham is an English folktale from Swaffham, Norfolk. The following text is taken from English Fairy and Other Folk Tales, 1906, which in turn refers to the Diary of Abraham dela Pryme, 1699:

== Sources ==
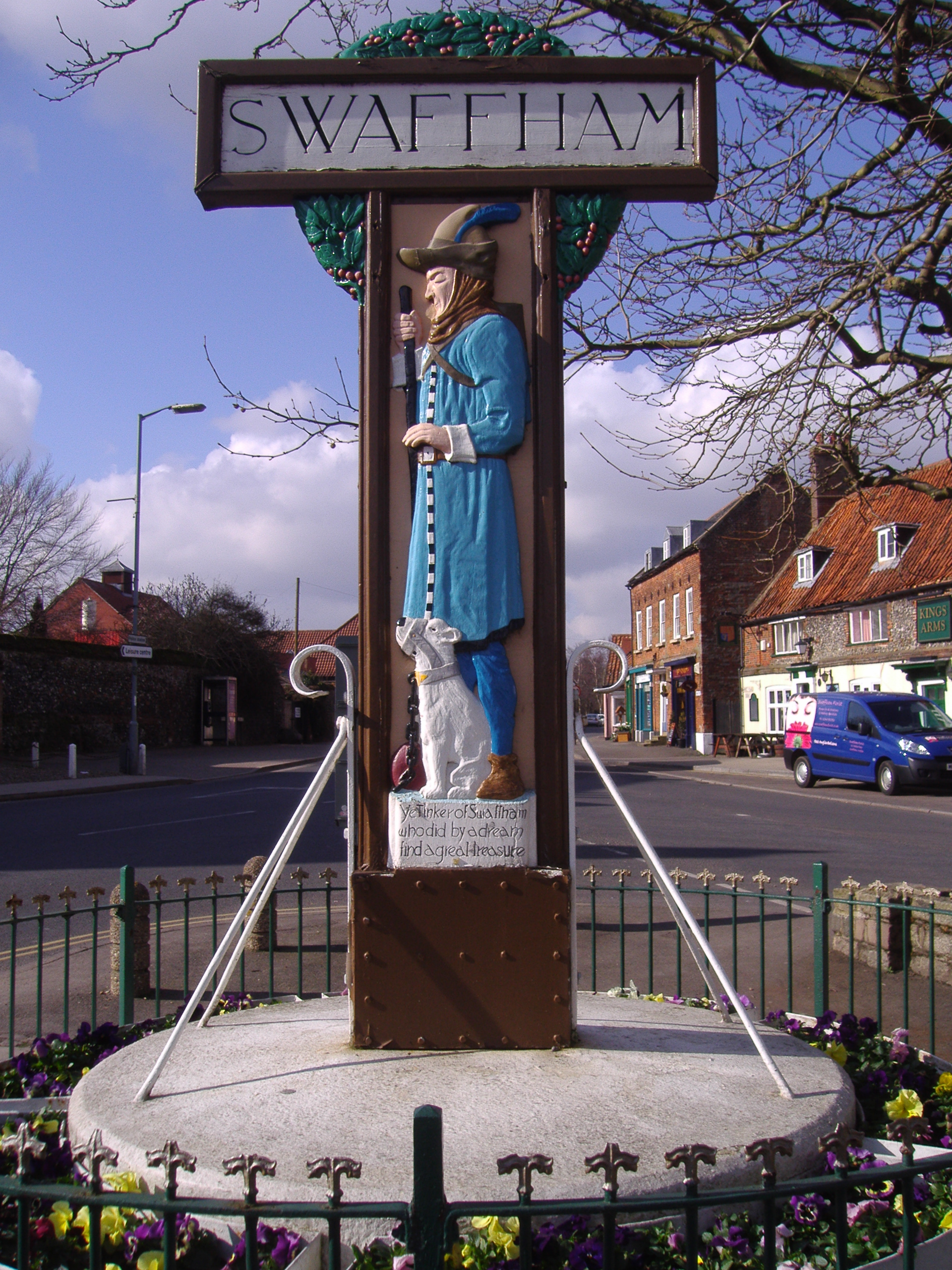
The pedlar of Swaffham on a Swaffham town sign

The Pedlar of Swaffham
Tradition says that there lived in former times in Soffham (Swaffham), alias Sopham, in Norfolk, a certain pedlar, who dreamed that if he went to London Bridge, and stood there, he should hear very joyfull news, which he at first slighted, but afterwards, his dream being doubled and trebled upon him, he resolved to try the issue of it, and accordingly went to London, and stood on the bridge there two or three days, looking about him, but heard nothing that might yield him any comfort.

At last it happened that a shopkeeper there, hard by, having noted his fruitless standing, seeing that he neither sold any wares nor asked any almes, went to him and most earnestly begged to know what he wanted there, or what his business was; to which the pedlar honestly answered that he had dreamed that if he came to London and stood there upon the bridge he should hear good newse; at which the shop-keeper laught heartily, asking him if he was such a fool as to take a journey on such a silly errand, adding: "I'll tell thee, country fellow, last night I dreamed that I was at Sopham, in Norfolk, a place utterly unknown to me, where methought behind a pedlar's house in a certain orchard, and under a great oak tree, if I dug I should find a vast treasure! Now think you," says he, "that I am such a fool to take such a long journey upon me upon the instigation of a silly dream? No, no, I'm wiser. Therefore, good fellow, learn wit from me, and get you home, and mind your business."

The pedlar observing his words, what he had say'd he dream'd, and knowing they concentred in him, glad of such joyfull newse, went speedily home, and digged and found a prodigious great treasure, with which he grew exceeding rich; and Soffham (Church) being for the most part fallen down, he set on workmen and rectified it most sumptuously, at his own charges; and to this day there is his statue therein, but in stone, with his pack at his back and his dogg at his heels; and his memory is also preserved by the same form or picture in most of the old glass windows, taverns, and alehouses of that town unto this day.

== Origins ==
Similar legends can be found throughout Europe and the Middle East. The earliest version is one of the poems of the Mathanawi titled "In Baghdad, Dreaming of Cairo: In Cairo, Dreaming of Baghdad", by 13th-century Persian poet Jalal al-Din Rumi. This poem was turned into a story in the tale from One Thousand and One Nights: "The man who became rich through a dream"; and spread through various countries' folklore, children's tales and literature.

More recently, the story was adapted into the plot of the novel The Alchemist by Paulo Coelho, who took the structure from Jorge Luis Borges story "The Tale of Two Dreamers" in A Universal History of Iniquity (1935).

== See also ==
- Upsall Castle, another English version of the folktale
- Dundonald Castle, Scottish version of the folktale
- English folklore, for a list of other English folktales
- Peddler
