= The Alchemist (novel) =

1988 novel by Paulo Coelho

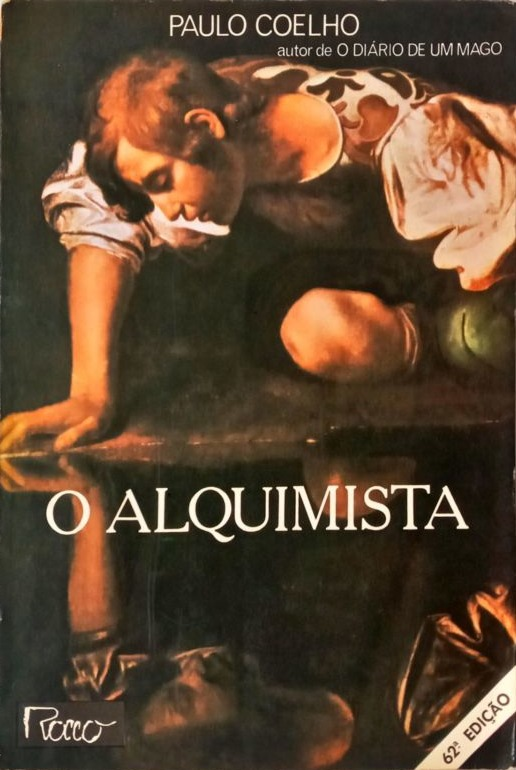
- Original Brazilian publication (publ. Rocco)
- Author: Paulo Coelho
- Original title: O Alquimista
- Illustrator: Paulo Coelho
- Cover artist: Caravaggio, Narcissus, 1597–9
- Language: Portuguese
- Genre: Quest, adventure, fantasy, bildungsroman
- Publisher: HarperTorch (English translation); Originally a novel written in Portuguese
- Publication date: 1988
- Publication place: Brazil
- English publication date: 1993
- Media type: Print (hardback, paperback and iTunes), audiobook (Audible)
- Pages: 163 pp (first English edition, hardcover), 208 pages (25th Anniversary Edition)
- ISBN: 0-06-250217-4 (first English edition, hardcover)
- OCLC: 26857452
- Dewey Decimal: 869.3
- Preceded by: The Pilgrimage (1987)
- Followed by: Brida (1990)

The Alchemist (Portuguese: O Alquimista) is a novel by Brazilian author Paulo Coelho which was first published in 1988. Originally written in Portuguese, it became a widely translated international bestseller. The story follows Santiago, a shepherd boy, in his journey across North Africa to the Egyptian pyramids after he dreams of finding treasure there. It has since been translated into more than 65 languages and has sold more than 150 million copies worldwide.

== Plot ==
An Andalusian shepherd boy named Santiago dreams of a treasure while in a ruined church. He consults a Gitano fortune-teller about the meaning of the recurring dream. The woman interprets it as a prophecy, telling the boy that he will discover a treasure at the Egyptian pyramids.

After Santiago sets out, he meets Melchizedek, the king of Salem, who tells him to sell his sheep so as to travel to Egypt and accomplish his "Personal Legend". Early on his arrival in Tangiers, a man who claims to be able to take Santiago to the pyramids instead robs him and takes all the money he made from selling his sheep. Santiago then has to work for a crystal merchant to earn enough to continue his journey.

Along the way, the boy meets an Englishman who has come in search of an alchemist who can turn any metal to gold, and continues his travels with his new companion. When they reach an oasis, Santiago meets and falls in love with an Arabian girl named Fatima, to whom he proposes marriage. She promises to marry him only after he completes his journey. Frustrated at first, he later learns that true love will not stop you from achieving what you want to do nor must one sacrifice one's destiny to it, since to do so robs it of truth.

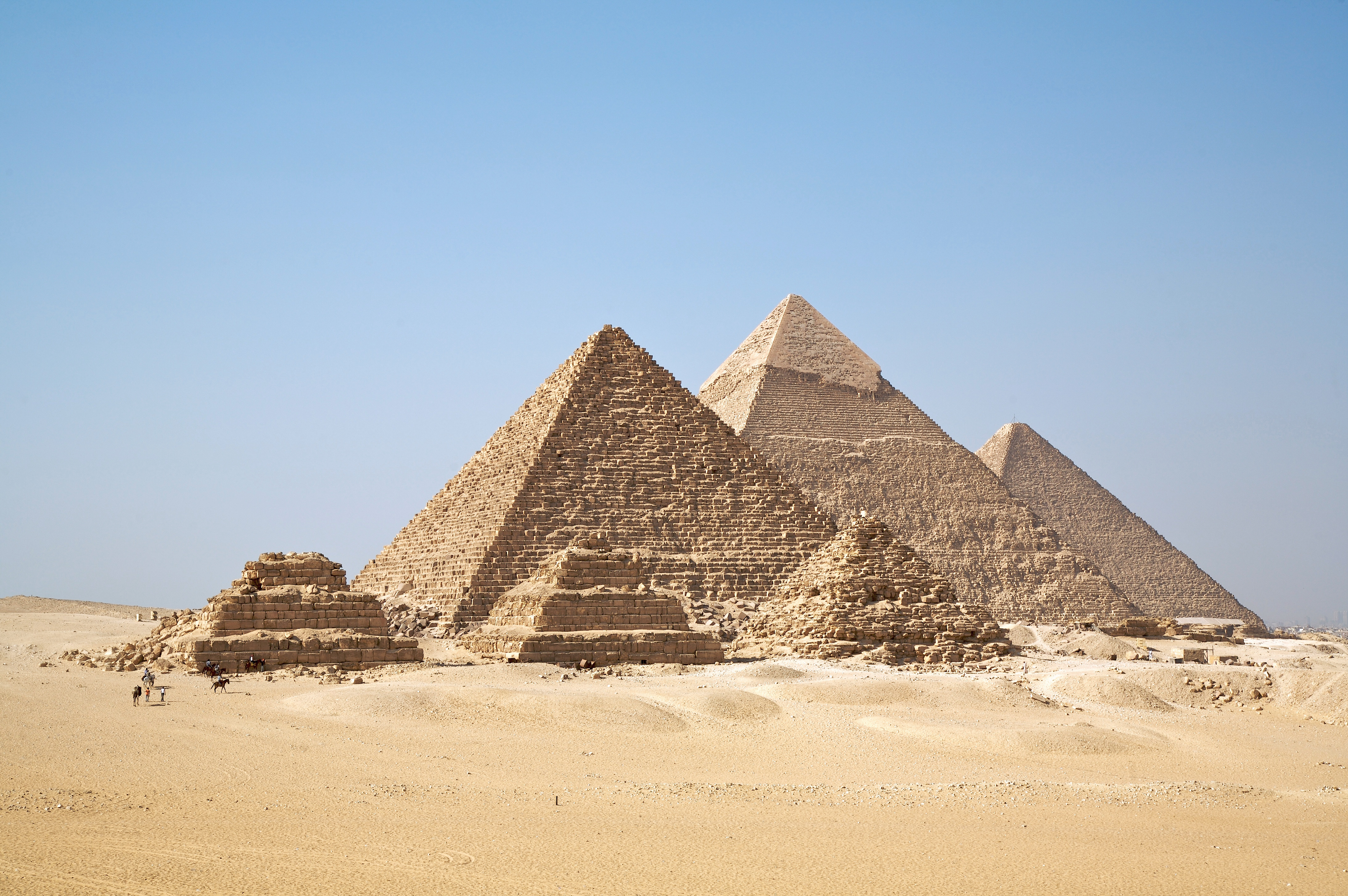
The Giza pyramid complex

The boy then encounters the wise alchemist, who teaches him to realise his true self. Together, they risk a journey through the territory of warring tribes, where Santiago is forced to demonstrate his oneness with the "Soul of the World" by turning himself into a dust storm before he is allowed to proceed.

When he reaches the pyramids and begins digging, he is robbed by thieves, who ask him what he is digging for; he replies that a dream has led him to buried treasure. The thieves scoff, and the leader remarks about a dream he once had about treasure under a tree at a ruined church. Santiago realises that the treasure he sought was where he had his original dream all along. After finding the treasure back at the ruined church, he decides to go back to Fatima, who awaits him.

== Themes ==
The plot of the novel builds on the international folktale type classified as no. 1645 ("The Treasure at Home") in the Aarne–Thompson–Uther Index of folktales: "A man dreams that if he goes to a distant city he will find treasure on a certain bridge. Finding no treasure, he tells his dream to a man who says that he too has dreamed of treasure at certain place. He describes the place, which is the first man's home. When the latter returns home he finds the treasure." The earliest known version of this tale type is a poem by the 13th-century Persian poet Rumi, and a variant of the tale appears in the One Thousand and One Nights collection of Arabic folktales.

The book's main theme is about finding one's destiny, although according to The New York Times, The Alchemist is "more self-help than literature". The advice given to Santiago that "when you really want something to happen, the whole universe will conspire so that your wish comes true" is the core of the novel's thinking. Coelho originally wrote The Alchemist in only two weeks, explaining later that he was able to work at this pace because the story was "already written in [his] soul."

== Critical reception ==
=== Universal simplicity ===
Many reviews point out that the book’s greatest asset is its simplicity. It lacks complex character development or dense prose, and functions almost like an extended modern folk tale or parable. This accessibility is what allows it to easily cross cultural and linguistic barriers, evidenced by its global sales in multiple languages. However, not all reviewers are convinced that this simplicity is a positive attribute, some, such as Gregory Cowles of The New York Times, believe the book to be “more self-help than literature” while admitting that this simplicity “hasn’t hurt it with readers.”

A review from The Guardian categorized The Alchemist as a children's book and praised the novel, saying, “the descriptions are awe–inspiring and the word choice is immaculate”.

As an example of this simplicity, Santiago has no problem that lasts for more than a few pages. He solves several of his obstacles through the intervention of an old king, magical rocks, a prophetic vision, an alchemist, a kindly monk and sheer luck. It seems that none of the characters have any kind of deep personal struggles, and this frustrates critics and enthrals readers at the same time.

=== Themes of destiny and motivational appeal ===
The novel has become a cultural phenomenon, with vocal fans like Bill Clinton and Will Smith, and has even ended up on school curricula and has sold over 100 million copies. Critics and casual readers both find that many lines in The Alchemist "sound like quotes you could frame and hang on your wall" But literary critics often push back against its soaring optimism, it has been called a "placebo". Critics frequently argue that its central philosophy that "the universe conspires to help you" (manifestation culture) borders on a simplistic view of systemic hardship or suffering.

There is evidence that being optimistic as the protagonist is in The Alchemist is better for us than being a pessimist, and that positive mindsets and attitudes can lead to more success and generally better outcomes in life. Reading this kind of book may make us feel temporarily hopeful, perhaps even giddily expectant, reality will inevitably catch up with us. Psychologist warn that we will end up feeling worse, not better, when the promised riches fail to arrive after they have been "manifested".

=== Religious criticism ===
Although the book has religious overtones, such as when Melchizedek says “God has prepared a path for everyone to follow, you just have to read the omens that he left for you.” Christian authors are divided on whether it supports or opposes traditional doctrine. Reviewers who write for Christian audiences argue that from a theological perspective The Alchemist promotes a form of "spiritualised selfishness" wrapped in pantheism ("all things are one")

But other Christian reviewers look on it more favourably, noting that despite its odd theology, The Alchemist can be seen as an antidote to the cynicism of modern materialism. Santiago finds a deeper, transcendent meaning and the implication is that all human lives are tied to an overarching narrative. They say the book should not be read as a dogmatic theological text, but as a modern parable that goes against a secular world by insisting that human lives possess inherent value and purpose.

== Adaptations ==
In 1994, a comic book adaptation was published by Alexandre Jubran. HarperOne, a HarperCollins imprint, produced an illustrated version of the novel, with paintings by the French artist Mœbius, but failed to convince Coelho "to consent to the full graphic-novel treatment". The Alchemist: A Graphic Novel was published in 2010, adapted by Derek Ruiz and with artwork by Daniel Sampere.

The Alchemist's Symphony by the young Walter Taieb was released in 1997 with the support of Paulo Coelho, who wrote an original text for the CD booklet. The work has eight movements and five interludes.

In 2002, a theatrical adaptation of The Alchemist was produced and performed in London. Since then there have been several productions by the Cornish Collective. A later London performance was visited by the producer Ashvin Gidwani who, finding it "verbose but colourful", decided to commission a new 90-minute version of the book from Deepa Gahlot for the Indian stage. This was eventually launched in 2009.

In 2006, Mistaken Identity, a Singapore indie rock band, adapted the story of the novel into what they claimed was "essentially our attempt at writing a musical" and released the track as "The Alchemist". Kochavva Paulo Ayyappa Coelho, an Indian Malayalam-language film written and directed by Sidhartha Siva, has its title inspired by novelist Paulo Coelho, and a central theme is inspired from The Alchemist.

In 2024, Kadokawa Corporation announced that a manga adaptation illustrated by Tamaki Nakamura would be released under their new Kadokawa Masterpiece Comics label in November 2024.

=== Film proposals ===
In 2008, the Weinstein Company bought the film rights, but the project stalled after the 2017 Harvey Weinstein sexual abuse scandal. In 2016, PalmStar Media acquired the film rights. In 2023, Legendary Entertainment got the film, television, and ancillary rights to make a film adaptation with TriStar Pictures and Palmstar Media with Jack Thorne attached as a writer.

== See also ==
- Pedlar of Swaffham - an English version of the story from the 1600s
