= Swaffham Town Hall =

Municipal building in Swaffham, Norfolk, England

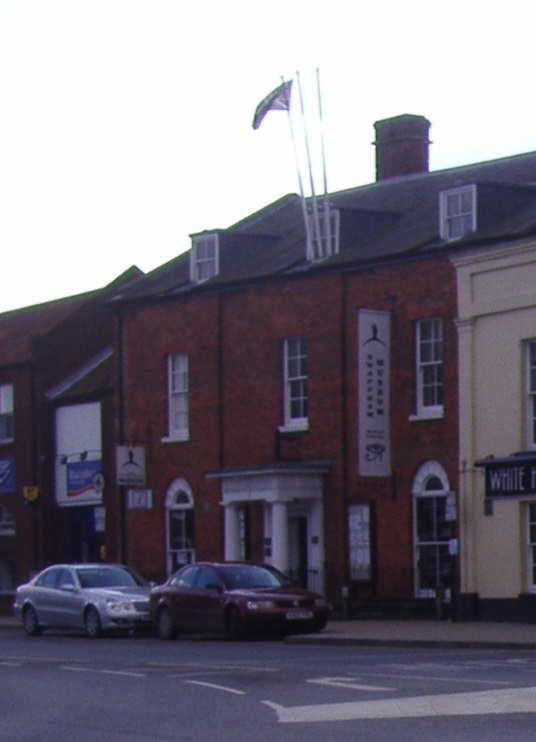
- The building in 2009

- Shown in Norfolk
- 52.6467°N 0.6882°E
- Location: London Street, Swaffham

History
- Built: c.1810

Site notes
- Architectural style: Neoclassical style

Listed Building – Grade II
- Official name: Town hall and attached front railings
- Designated: 17 January 1973
- Reference no.: 1269635

Swaffham Town Hall is a municipal building in London Street in Swaffham, a town in Norfolk, in England. The building, which now accommodates the Swaffham Museum and the offices of Swaffham Town Council, is a Grade II listed building.

== History ==
The building was commissioned the brewer, John Morse, for use as his home. The site he selected was on the west side of London Street, adjacent to the White Hart Inn.

The building was designed in the neoclassical style, built in red brick and was completed in around 1810. (Note: Thomas Morse (John's father) acquired the Swaffham Brewery in 1809 and John became the head brewer. The house must have been completed shortly thereafter, as English Heritage says that it is early 19th century.) The design involved a symmetrical main frontage of three bays facing onto London Street. The central areas of the bays were slightly projected forward, relative to the outer areas. The central bay featured a porch formed by a pair of Doric order columns and a pair of pilasters supporting an entablature with triglyphs and a cornice. The other bays on the ground floor were fenestrated by round-headed windows, while the first floor was fenestrated by sash windows with window sills and there were dormer windows at attic level. Internally, the principal room was the dining room with a pair of Doric order columns at the south end.

In 1894, the local urban sanitary district board was replaced by a new urban district council. The council was initially based at the Shirehall but, in the early 1950s, civic leaders decided that they needed a dedicated building for their offices and meeting place. In 1955, the building was purchased by Swaffham Urban District Council to use as a town hall, with the dining room being converted into a council chamber.

In the late 1950s, three PGM-17 Thor nuclear missiles were located near-by at RAF North Pickenham, giving rise to protests by the Campaign for Nuclear Disarmament. Considerable interest was generated in the British tabloid newspapers in December 1958, when the Russian news agency, TASS, telephoned the town hall to inquire about the protests: on this basis, the journalists concluded that the protests were communist-inspired. The building was grade II listed in 1973.

The building continued to serve as the offices of Swaffham Urban District Council for two decades, but ceased to be the local seat of government when Breckland District Council was formed in 1974. Since then, it has accommodated the offices and meeting place of Swaffham Town Council.

Works of art in the town hall include a landscape painting by Samuel John Carter, depicting horses drinking at a local farm.

== The museum ==
In 1986, Swaffham Museum opened in the building. It is an independent social history museum covering the town and surrounding villages. It has five galleries exhibiting local history and local geology as well as an Egyptology room about Howard Carter and the Ancient Egyptians, celebrating the centenary year of Howard Carter discovering the Tomb of Tutankhamun in 1922. There is also a display about the author, Captain W. E. Johns, who, after serving as a local sanitary inspector, created the fictional air-adventurer Biggles, and there are some items which belonged to Admiral of the Fleet Sir Arthur Wilson, 3rd Baronet, who served as First Sea Lord shortly before the First World War.
