= St James Mill =

Disused mill in Norwich, England

Coordinates: 52.6350°N 1.3013°E

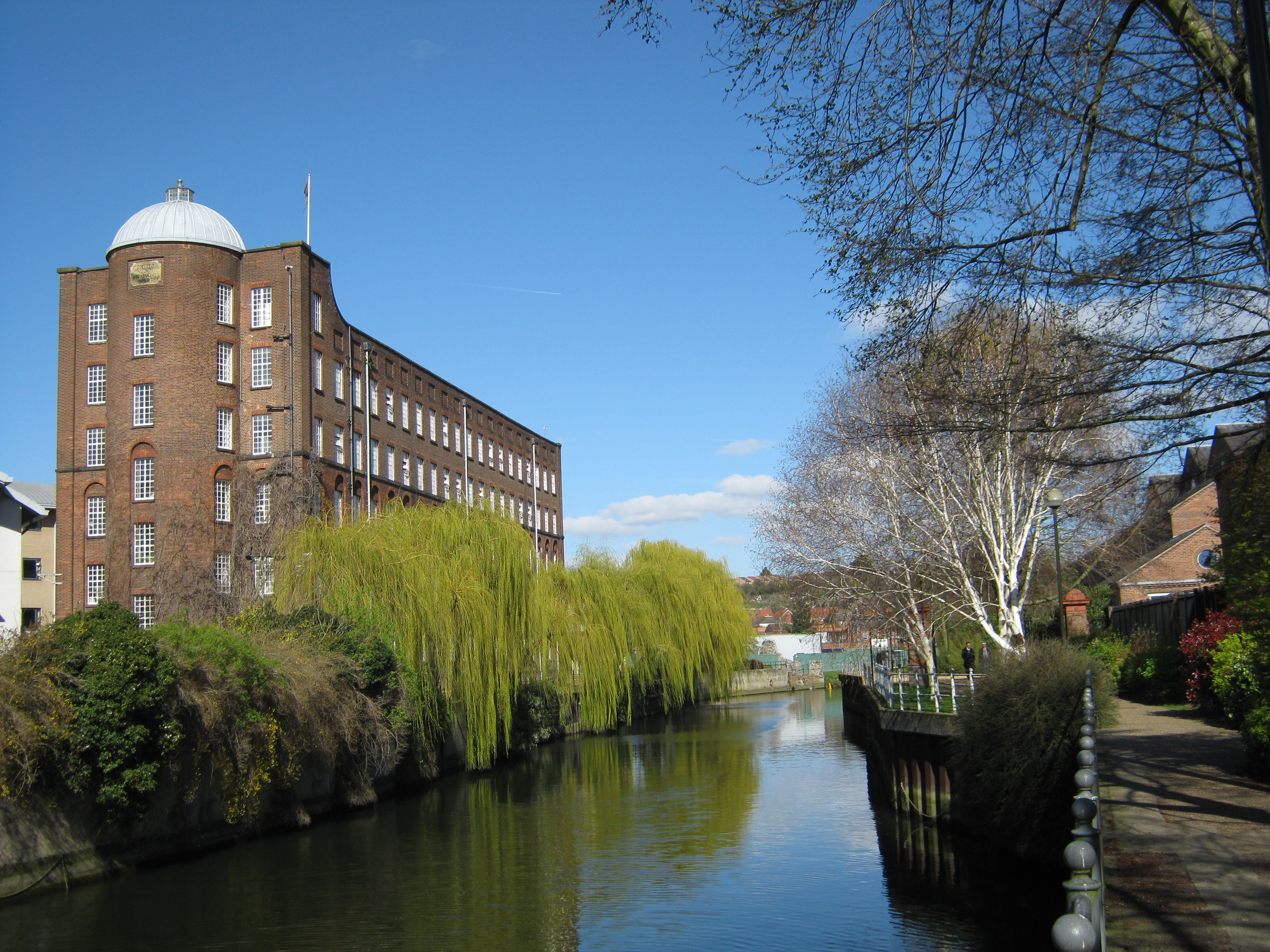
St. James Mill

St James Mill is an English Industrial Revolution mill in Norwich.

It was built between 1836 and 1839 as part of an attempt by the Norwich Yarn Company (established 1833 by Samuel Bignold) to prevent the collapse of the local textile trade. The architect was John Brown. The site was occupied by the White Friars (Carmelites) in the 13th century, and an original arch and undercroft survive.

When the local textile trade went into further decline, St James Mill was bought by Jarrold & Sons Ltd for use by its printing department in 1902. The building was subsequently leased to Caley's, the chocolate manufacturer, and sold to the government as a training factory for war veterans in 1920.

Jarrolds bought back the mill in 1933 and today it is a private office complex. Among the organisations based there are Virgin Wines and Norfolk Community Foundation.

The mill is part of the Norwich 12.
