= Great Hospital =

Medieval former hospital in Norwich, England

- Norwich 12
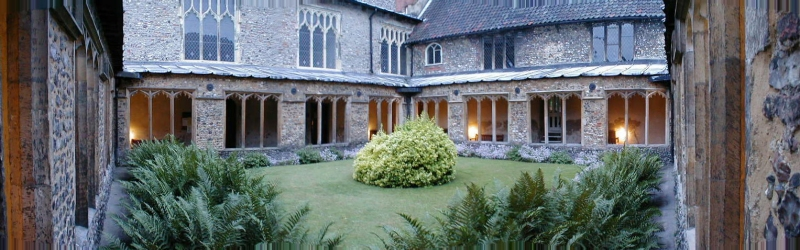

Geography
- Location: Norwich, United Kingdom
- Coordinates: 52.6328°N 1.3047°E

Organisation
- Religious affiliation: Roman Catholic

History
- Founded: 1249

Links
- Lists: Hospitals in the United Kingdom

The Great Hospital is a medieval hospital that has been serving the people of Norwich in Norfolk, UK, since the 13th century. It is linked to the Church of England Cathedral next to it.

It is situated on a 7-acre (2.8 ha) site in a bend of the River Wensum to the north-east of Norwich Cathedral. Founded in 1249 by Bishop Walter de Suffield, the hospital was originally known as Giles's Hospital. What makes the hospital notable today is its history of continuous care, the range of existing medieval buildings on the hospital grounds (most of which are still in use), and the extensive archives that record the hospital's long history.

== History ==
The original beneficiaries of the new hospital in 1249 were aged priests, poor scholars, and sick and hungry paupers. Clerics remained unmarried in this period, so they had no family to support them in old age. The poor scholars, boys selected on merit from local song schools, were to receive a daily meal during term times. This was to continue until the boy had achieved a good grasp of Latin. With this help, bright but poor boys were given the chance to train as choristers or even to enter the priesthood.

Thirty beds were earmarked for the sick poor, and thirteen paupers were to be fed at the hospital gates each day. Four chaplains, a deacon and sub-deacon, as well as a master of St. Giles's, were appointed. The hospital was modelled upon the Augustinian rule under which excessive liturgical ritual was discouraged to permit more time for charitable works. Nevertheless, the master and chaplains were bound to sing three masses a day, including one for Bishop Suffield's soul, as well as a weekly mass in honour of Saint Giles.

== Modern times ==
Since the mid-19th century, living accommodation has been constantly improved to meet residents' needs. In 1849, five cottages were built; a sick ward followed in 1889, a further 12 cottages in 1906, and another 17 dwellings in 1937. However, it was not only the hospital's rising population that generated the need for new buildings; newcomers had higher expectations of levels of comfort, privacy, and space. As a result, the 17 cottages built in 1937 (now called Suffield Court) were later changed to single-person dwellings.

In 1972, the old sick ward was replaced by Elaine Herbert House, where an improved form of nursing care was provided. The lodge was finally demolished in 1975. Prior Court consists of eighteen single and six double flats which are designed to accommodate people who need regular support. It was opened in June 1980. In 1986, St Helen's House was converted into eight residential flats. In 1999 a new group of cottages were built behind Suffield Court.

Plans were made to demolish the 12 cottages built in 1906, and replace them with a new two-storey block containing 18 flats. The plans were passed and the demolition and new building work commenced during 2011. These plans include six additional flats to be added to Prior Court, the redesign of the main carpark and a new workshop to be built on the site of the current garages.

The new two-storey block of 18 flats now called Holme Terrace is almost fully occupied and the refurbished Prior Court should start taking in residents within the next few weeks.

The Great Hospital is part of Norwich 12.

== Buildings ==
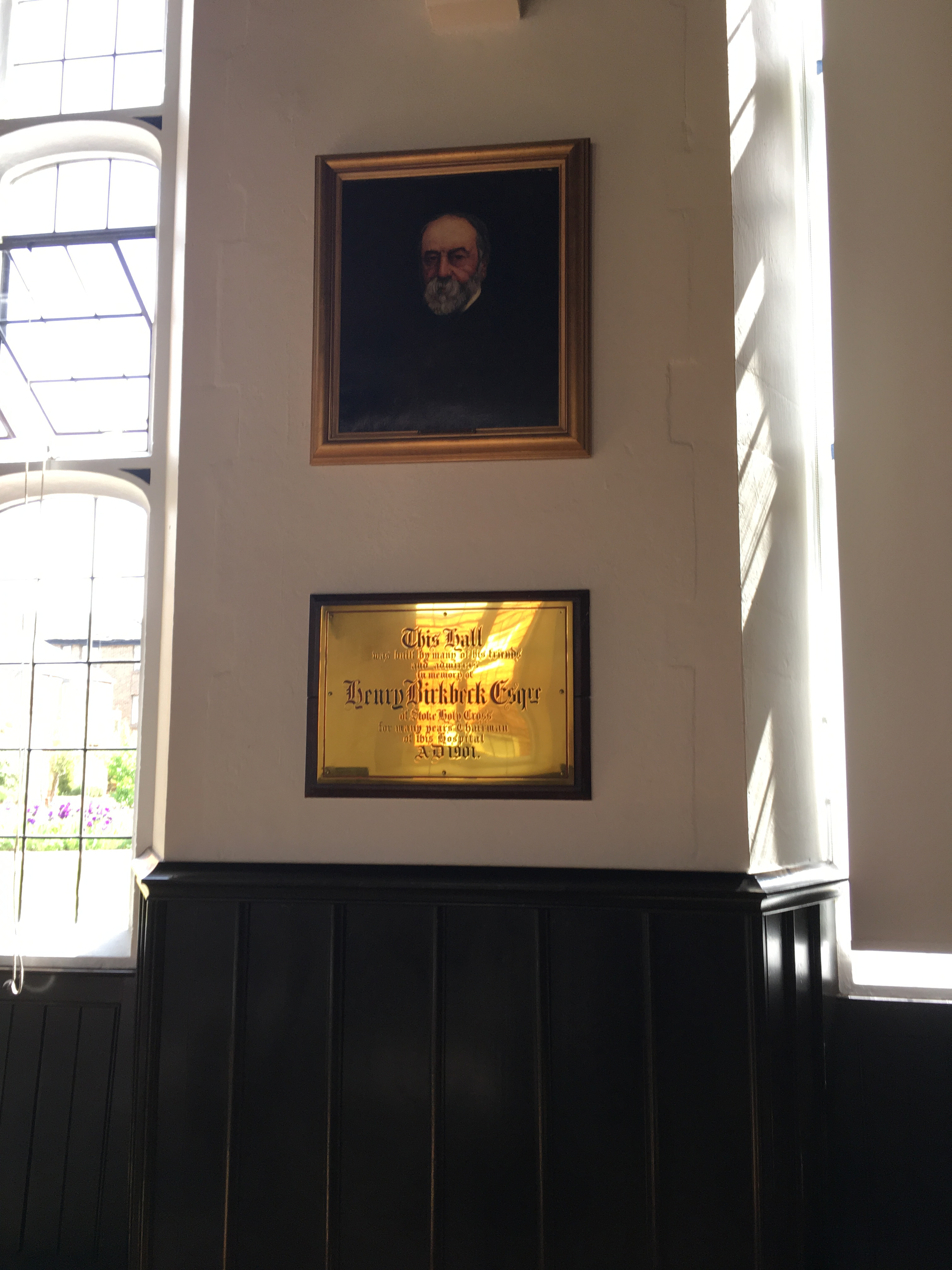
A plaque detailing the construction of Birkbeck Hall. The plaque reads 'This hall was built by many of his friends and admirers in memory of Henry Birkbeck Esqre of Stoke Holy Cross for many years chairman of this Hospital A.D 1901' The painting above is of Birkbeck

The Hospital has 9 listed buildings:(all information from The Historic England website)

Building	Listing	List UID	Date Listed
Birkbeck Hall	Grade II	1051369	26 February 1954
Cloisters and West Wall of the Former Chapter house	Grade I	1280660	26 February 1954
Former Chaplain's House	Grade I	1205562	26 February 1954
Former Master's house	Grade I	1205544	26 February 1954
Part of Former Master's House	Grade I	1051368	26 February 1954
Refectory and part of Former Master's House	Grade I	1372739	26 February 1954
The Lodge	Grade II	1372740	26 February 1954
East Wards	Grade II	1372741	5 June 1972
White Cottages	Grade	1051370	5 June 1972

St. Helen's House is a Grade II* Listed building currently in use at the nursing home, but is not part of the Great Hospital as it was originally a residence separate from the Hospital. The house has a painting said to be the work of Angelica Kauffman.

== Masters of the Great Hospital ==
The Head of the Great Hospital is called 'Master'. Hamon de Calthorpe was the first Master in 1256, and sixty-four Masters have followed him until the present day. Substantial changes that modernised the Great Hospital and ensured that it was a model community for the elderly going into the twenty-first century were initiated by Jack Davies Shaw, Master from 1965 until 1980. The first female Master was Dorothy North from 2000 until 2007, and the current Master is Gina Dormer.
