= Corn Exchange, Fakenham =

Commercial building in Fakenham, Norfolk, England

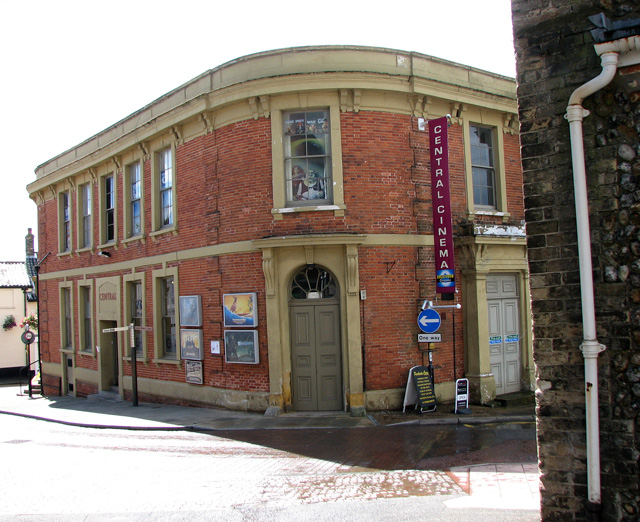
- Corn Exchange, Fakenham

- Shown in Norfolk
- 52.8302°N 0.8469°E
- Location: Market Place, Fakenham

History
- Built: 1855

Site notes
- Architect: John Brown
- Architectural style: Italianate style

Listed Building – Grade II
- Official name: Central Cinema
- Designated: 15 February 1979
- Reference no.: 1039424

The Corn Exchange is a commercial building in the Market Place, Fakenham, Norfolk, England. The structure, which is currently used as a cinema, is a Grade II listed building.

== History ==
In the early 1850s, a group of local businessmen decided to form a private company, known as the "Fakenham Corn Exchange and Public Rooms Company", to finance and commission a purpose-built corn exchange for the town. The investors included Thomas Coke, 2nd Earl of Leicester, whose seat was at Holkham Hall, and who took a personal interest in the project. The site they selected, in the centre of the Market Place, had been occupied by a market cross and sessions hall which dated back to 1649. The sessions hall was arcaded on the ground floor, so that markets could be held; it also had an assembly room, which was used as a school, on the first floor, but it was demolished in 1801.

The current building was designed by John Brown of Norwich in the Italianate style, built in red brick with ashlar stone dressings at a cost of £4,000 and was completed in 1855. The design involved a symmetrical main frontage of five bays facing west onto Old Post Office Street. It was originally fenestrated by five sash windows with architraves, window cills and keystones on each floor. The corners, which were rounded, contained doorways with fanlights flanked by pilasters and brackets supporting cornices. The side elevations, of three bays each, featured two-bay projections, with rounded corners, which were fenestrated by pairs of round-headed windows. At roof level, there was heavy cornice, supported by brackets, and a parapet. Internally, as well as the main hall, which was used by traders, there was a courtroom for the magistrates and a library.

The use of the building as a corn exchange declined significantly in the wake of the Great Depression of British Agriculture in the late 19th century. Instead, the building was converted into a cinema, capable of seating 700 people, in 1930. The cinema was branded as the "Central Cinema" in 1937 and a plaque, inscribed with the inscription "Central", was installed above a new doorway in the central bay. After serving as the headquarters of the local Home Guard during the Second World War, the cinema closed in 1976.

The building was re-purposed as a bingo hall in the late 1970s but became vacant in the mid-1990s. After an extensive programme of refurbishment works, carried out to a design by Nicholas Hills, it was then reopened as the "Hollywood Cinema" in July 2000. It subsequently changed ownership in 2009, and, again, in 2017.

== See also ==
- Corn exchanges in England
