= Rat Scabies and The Holy Grail =

2005 book by Christopher Dawes

- Author: Christopher Dawes
- Language: English
- Genre: Gonzo journalism
- Publisher: Sceptre Books
- Publication date: 2005, 2006
- Publication place: United Kingdom
- Pages: 325
- ISBN: 978-0-340-83211-0
- OCLC: 439637364

Rat Scabies And The Holy Grail is a 2005 book written by Christopher Dawes, published by Sceptre Books in the UK and Thunder's Mouth Press in the US. It is a gonzo-esque quest to find the Holy Grail by punk rock legend Rat Scabies, the one-time drummer of The Damned, with whom Dawes strikes up a friendship when the two become neighbours in the London suburb of Brentford.

The book, which has been described as "The Da Vinci Code gets the punk rock treatment" (The Bookseller), begins with Scabies introducing Dawes to the alleged mystery of Rennes-le-Château, a remote French village associated with all manner of esoteric conspiracy theories. Scabies and Dawes make several trips to Rennes-le-Château and also visit other places said to be linked to the Holy Grail, including Rosslyn Chapel in Scotland. The book is an often hilarious account of the pair’s adventures - they even manage to wangle themselves an invitation to a Knights Templar initiation ceremony - and its supporting cast of characters includes Henry Lincoln (the author of Holy Blood, Holy Grail) and a CIA operative, plus assorted treasure hunters, occultists, alien channelers, reincarnated medieval heretics, and numerous members of secret societies.
