= John Dugmore of Swaffham =

- Born: 1793
- Died: 1871 (aged 77–78)
- Occupations: Draughtsman, grand-tourist
- Relatives: Lady Hutton (daughter-in-law)

John Dugmore of Swaffham (1793–1871) was a British draughtsman and grand-tourist. He realized at least 130 drawings and watercolours, most of them in Germany, France and Italy.

== Biography ==
Born in a Norfolk noble family, he had a deep classical education. Renowned for his taste in arts, he moved to London to seek his fame and fortune at the Royal Court, where he met his ‘patron’, William Charles Keppel (1772-1849), 4th Earl of Albemarle. Dugmore was probably responsible for Keppel children's education.

=== The Grand Tour ===
In 1820, Dugmore accompanied in the Grand Tour a son of Charles Keppel, perhaps George Thomas (1799-1891), later 6th Earl of Albemarle, Viscount of Bury and Baron of Ashford, who made a brilliant military career (started at Waterloo) as well as was a memorialist, a distinguished collector and a member of the English Society of Antiquaries. They moved from Scotland to Western Bohemia, France, Switzerland and Italy. In around 20 months, Dugmore fixed on paper everything that surprised him, mostly mountains, lakes, rivers and other natural features. Sometimes he sketched interesting architecture or historical places, for instance the cell in the Great St. Bernard Hospice where Napoleon slept during his crossing of the Alps (1800) or the Clermont Castle, former residence of Blaise Pascal.

== Works ==
Lady Hutton, Dugmore's daughter-in-law, mentioned the existence of many albums filled by 130 c. drawings. 65 drawings are recorded in detail in Lady Hutton's last will. Among them, 47 were recently discovered by Guy Peppiat and offered on sale at an English auction house. Another one is filed in Sabin Galleries archives, London. These works are usually made on a slightly cream paper, 260x200 mm., by pencil, pen and black ink.

=== Value ===
Dugmore's urban landscapes are visual witnesses of the shape of many main and minor European cities, among them Paris, Vichy, Clermont-Ferrand, Lyon, Schandau, Tivoli, Susa, Florence and Siena. Dugmore is considered relevant for his ability in feeling and amplifying the aesthetics which he was meeting. For instance, his ‘German’ drawings are very linear and pure; on the opposite side his ‘French’ drawings are ‘touched’ by pencil and brush in a way that seems largely to anticipate the impressionist idea of the light.

=== Museums ===
Three works by Dugmore are included in the Progetto Linea, a large private project for increasing the paper cabinets in Italian public museums of art.
