= Christopher Dawes (author) =

British journalist and author

Christopher Dawes (born 26 February 1961) is a British journalist and author. He works as a music journalist using the pseudonym Push.

As Push, he wrote for the weekly music paper Melody Maker from 1985 to 1995. He was also the editor of the seminal London music magazine The Buzz from 1987 until its demise. He left Melody Maker in 1995 to become the founding editor of the clubbing magazine Muzik, before becoming the editor of the male lifestyle title Mondo in 1999. After several years as a book author, he returned to magazine publishing in 2012 as the editor of the specialist electronic music magazine Electronic Sound.

Dawes was responsible for nurturing and guiding some of the brightest talent of the day, many of whom went on to further success in the music industry. He was one of the first UK music journalists to write about acid house and during his time at Melody Maker he conducted early interviews with the likes of Pulp, Soul II Soul, N.W.A, Soundgarden, De La Soul and The Orb. The very first interviews in the UK press with The Sugarcubes, Carter USM and The Shamen were published in The Buzz during his time as the editor.

Dawes's best known book is Rat Scabies And The Holy Grail, published in 2005 by Sceptre Books in the UK (ISBN 0-340-83211-8) and by Thunder's Mouth Press in the US (ISBN 1-56025-678-8). It is a gonzo-esque quest to find the Holy Grail by punk rock legend Rat Scabies, the one-time drummer of The Damned, with whom Dawes strikes up a friendship when the two become neighbours in the London suburb of Brentford.

== Bibliography ==
- Push; Mireille Silcott (2000). The Book of E: All About Ecstasy. Omnibus Press. ISBN 9780711975194.
- Christopher Dawes; Mark Roland; Paul Thompson; Steven Appleton (2004). Pussy: For Cats That Should Know Better. Bantam Press. ISBN 9780593053461.
- Christopher Dawes; Mark Roland; Paul Thompson; Steven Appleton (2005). Bitch. Transworld Publishers. ISBN 9780593054994.
- Christopher Dawes (2005). Rat Scabies and The Holy Grail. Sceptre Books. p. 325. ISBN 9780340832110.
