= Oaks, Texas =

- Unincorporated community
- Location within Texas Location within the United States
- Coordinates: 28°36′32″N 98°01′54″W
- Country: United States
- State: Texas
- County: Bee
- Elevation: 354 ft (108 m)
- Time zone: UTC-6 (Central (CST))
  - Summer (DST): UTC-5 (CDT)
- Area code: 361
- GNIS feature ID: 1380280

Oaks is an unincorporated community in Bee County, in the U.S. state of Texas. It is located within the Beeville micropolitan area.

== History ==
The area in what is now known as Oaks today was first settled in the late 1800s. There were two mills in the community in the mid-1930s. Many residents left after World War II, but the community had two businesses and several scattered homes as late as the mid-1960s. It was classified as a "dispersed farming community" in 2000.

== Geography ==
Oaks is located on Texas State Highway 72, 21 mi (34 km) northwest of Beeville, and 4 mi (6.4 km) southwest of Pawnee in northwestern Bee County.

== Education ==
Schoolchildren in the Oaks community attended County Line School in the mid-1930s. Today, the community is served by the Pawnee Independent School District.
