= Caesar, Texas =

- Unincorporated community
- Location within Texas Location within the United States
- Coordinates: 28°39′20″N 97°53′54″W
- Country: United States
- State: Texas
- County: Bee
- Elevation: 423 ft (129 m)
- Time zone: UTC-6 (Central (CST))
  - Summer (DST): UTC-5 (CDT)
- Area code: 361
- GNIS feature ID: 1379489

Caesar is an unincorporated community in Bee County, in the U.S. state of Texas. It is located within the Beeville micropolitan area.

== History ==
The Pullin-Livingston Cemetery is the only thing remaining in the community today. It was originally called Wolfe's Neighborhood after Peter Wolfe, who settled in the area before 1876. The named changed to Caesar in the early 1900s, when R.L. Peevy built the first store there and applied for a post office.

== Geography ==
Caesar is located on Farm to Market Road 798, 8 mi (13 km) northwest of Pettus in northern Bee County.

== Education ==
Children attended a local school called the Caesar School. Today, the community is served by the Pawnee Independent School District.
