= NAS Chase Field-Building 1001 =

- U.S. National Register of Historic Places
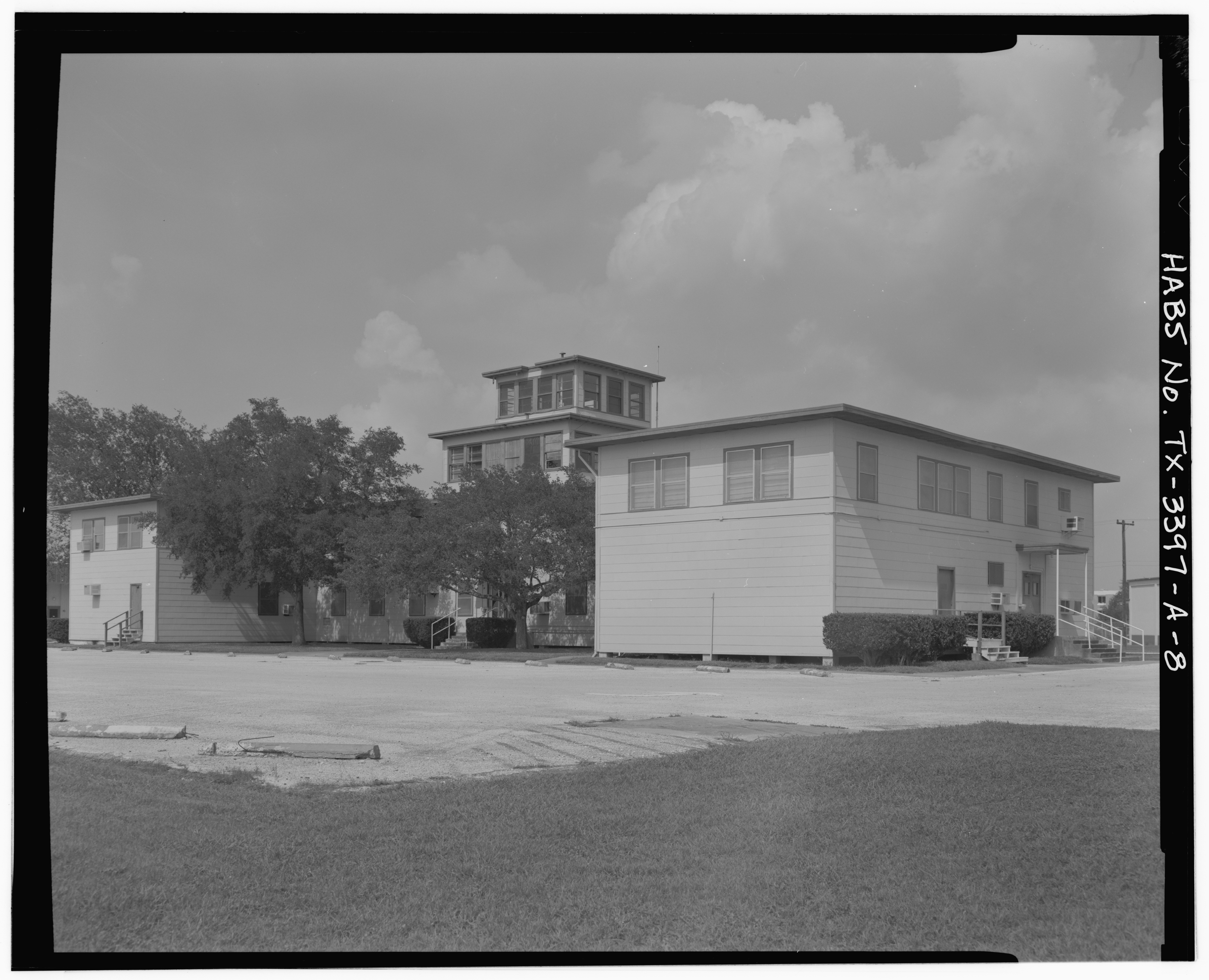
- View from southwest of Building 1001

- Location within Texas Location within the United States
- Location: Independence St., 0.45 mi. S of jct. with SH 202, Beeville, Texas
- Coordinates: 28°22′22″N 97°39′48″W
- Area: less than one acre
- Built: 1943
- Built by: Brown Bellows & Columbia
- Architect: Robert & Company
- MPS: NAS Chase Field MPS
- NRHP reference No.: 94000050
- Added to NRHP: February 23, 1994

The NAS Chase Field-Building 1001, also known as Administration Building, near Beeville, Texas was built in 1943. It was listed on the National Register of Historic Places in 1994.

Building 1001 was one of the first buildings completed on the field, in 1943. It served as the "symbolic heart" of the naval air station in Bee County until the station closed in 1993. All commanding officers of the base have been officed there. It served as an administration building. It is a two-story H-shaped building with a four-story tower that provides a sweeping view of the area.

It is one of seven buildings on Naval Air Station Chase Field that were listed on the National Register as part of a study of its historic resources.

== See also ==
- National Register of Historic Places listings in Bee County, Texas
