= Cadiz, Texas =

- Unincorporated community
- Location within Texas Location within the United States
- Coordinates: 28°25′38″N 97°56′22″W
- Country: United States
- State: Texas
- County: Bee
- Elevation: 345 ft (105 m)
- Time zone: UTC-6 (Central (CST))
  - Summer (DST): UTC-5 (CDT)
- Area code: 361
- GNIS feature ID: 1378082

Cadiz is an unincorporated community in Bee County, in the U.S. state of Texas. According to the Handbook of Texas, the community had a population of 15 in 2000. It is located within the Beeville micropolitan area.

== Geography ==
Cadiz is located on Farm-to-Market Road 799 near La Para Creek, 12 mi (19 km) west of Beeville in western Bee County.

== Education ==
Today, the community is served by the Beeville Independent School District.
