= National Register of Historic Places listings in Bee County, Texas =

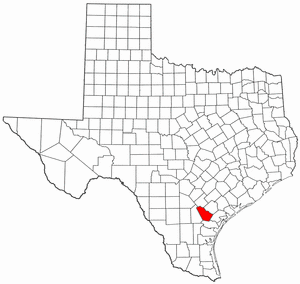
Location of Bee County in Texas

This is a list of the National Register of Historic Places listings in Bee County, Texas.

This is intended to be a complete list of properties listed on the National Register of Historic Places in Bee County, Texas. There are 13 properties listed on the National Register in the county. Five properties are designated as Recorded Texas Historic Landmarks including one that is also a State Antiquities Landmark.

This National Park Service list is complete through NPS recent listings posted August 1, 2025.

== Current listings ==
The locations of National Register properties may be seen in a mapping service provided.

	Name on the Register	Image	Date listed	Location	City or town	Description
1	Bee County Courthouse	Bee County Courthouse	February 9, 2001 (#01000105)	105 W. Corpus Christi St. 28°24′04″N 97°44′53″W	Beeville	State Antiquities Landmark, Recorded Texas Historic Landmark
2	Beeville Post Office	Beeville Post Office	April 4, 2007 (#07000272)	111 N. St. Mary's St. 28°24′10″N 97°44′55″W	Beeville	Recorded Texas Historic Landmark
3	Lott-Canada School	Lott-Canada School	December 7, 2010 (#10000981)	900 W. Corpus Christi St. 28°23′53″N 97°45′26″W	Beeville	Historic and Architectural Resources Associated with the Rosenwald School Program in Texas MPS; currently a branch location for the Coastal Bend College.
4	Medio Creek Bridge	Medio Creek Bridge	October 13, 1988 (#88002000)	CR 241; 28°31′46″N 97°47′39″W	Normanna	Recorded Texas Historic Landmark; also called Normanna Bridge
5	NAS Chase Field-Building 1001	NAS Chase Field-Building 1001	February 23, 1994 (#94000050)	Independence St., 0.45 mi. S of jct. with TX 202; 28°22′24″N 97°39′49″W	Beeville vicinity	Administration Building
6	NAS Chase Field-Building 1009	NAS Chase Field-Building 1009	February 23, 1994 (#94000051)	Essex St. 0.68 mi. SSE of the jct. of TX 202 and Independence St. 28°22′23″N 97°39′41″W	Beeville vicinity	Enlisted WAVES Barracks
7	NAS Chase Field-Building 1015	NAS Chase Field-Building 1015	February 23, 1994 (#94000052)	Byrd St. 0.82 mi. SSE of jct. of TX 202 and Independence St. 28°22′09″N 97°39′39″W	Beeville vicinity	Landplane Hangar
8	NAS Chase Field-Building 1040	NAS Chase Field-Building 1040	February 23, 1994 (#94000053)	Enterprise St. 0.37 mi. SSE of the jct. of TX 202 and Independence St. 28°22′32″N 97°39′46″W	Beeville vicinity	Auditorium/Gym/Chapel
9	NAS Chase Field-Building 1042	NAS Chase Field-Building 1042	February 23, 1994 (#94000054)	Ofstie Rd. 0.6 mi. SSE of the jct. of TX 202 and Independence St. 28°22′22″N 97°39′39″W	Beeville vicinity	Brig
10	NAS Chase Field-Quarters R	NAS Chase Field-Quarters R	February 23, 1994 (#94000055)	Essex St. 0.43 mi. SSW of the jct. of TX 202 and Independence St. 28°22′28″N 97°39′51″W	Beeville vicinity	Commanding Officer's Quarters
11	NAS Chase Field-Quarters S	NAS Chase Field-Quarters S	February 23, 1994 (#94000056)	Essex St. 0.45 mi. SSW of the jct. of TX 202 and Independence St. 28°22′29″N 97°39′55″W	Beeville vicinity	Executive Officer's Quarters
12	Praeger Building	Praeger Building	September 9, 1982 (#82004490)	110 W. Corpus Christi St. 28°24′06″N 97°44′57″W	Beeville	Recorded Texas Historic Landmark
13	Rialto Theater	Rialto Theater	November 21, 2001 (#01001265)	112-114 N. Washington St. 28°24′08″N 97°44′57″W	Beeville	Recorded Texas Historic Landmark; also called Hall-Rialto Theater

== See also ==
- National Register of Historic Places listings in Texas
- Recorded Texas Historic Landmarks in Bee County
