= The Texas Mile =

- Genre: Auto Show
- Dates: March and October
- Venue: Chase Field Industrial Complex
- Location: Beeville, TX
- Country: United States
- Inaugurated: 2003
- Next event: October 27-29, 2023
- Participants: 250+
- Website: www.texasmile.net

The Texas Mile is a land speed auto racing event near Beeville, Texas, at the Chase Field Industrial Complex. Participants, amateur and professional alike, from across the globe test their fastest standing 1-mile speeds in a wide range of vehicles. The bi-annual 3 day motorsports event takes place the last weekend of March and of October.

== History ==
The first Texas Mile event was in October 2003 at the Goliad County Industrial Airpark, near Goliad, Texas, with 35 participants and relatively no spectators. The event was co-founded by Jay Matus and his wife, Shannon Matus under J&S Matus Motorsports, Inc. The event remained in Goliad until the United States Navy purchased the airfield in early 2011, with that year's Texas Mile relocating to the Chase Field Industrial Complex in Beeville, Texas. In 2017, the Texas Mile relocated to the Victoria Regional Airport in Victoria, Texas. The Texas Mile returned to Chase Field Industrial Complex in October 2020, after the March 2020 event at Victoria Regional Airport was cancelled due to the COVID-19 pandemic in Texas.

Over 250 sports cars, motorcycles, trucks and concept race cars participate in the standing 1-Mile event on an airport runway strip with 1/2 Mile to shutdown. Participants come from the United States, Finland, Saudi Arabia, Mexico and Canada.

The current Texas Mile record is held by M2K Motorsports' 2006 Ford GT, driven by Patrick O'Gorman, clocking in at 300.4 mph (483.4 km/h). The record-setting speed was achieved during the March 2019 Texas Mile event, at Victoria Regional Airport.
