= Yougeen, Texas =

- Unincorporated community
- Location within Texas Location within the United States
- Coordinates: 28°19′25″N 97°42′17″W
- Country: United States
- State: Texas
- County: Bee
- Elevation: 154 ft (47 m)
- Time zone: UTC-6 (Central (CST))
  - Summer (DST): UTC-5 (CDT)
- Area code: 361
- GNIS feature ID: 1379297

Yougeen is an unincorporated community in Bee County, in the U.S. state of Texas. It is located within the Beeville micropolitan area.

== History ==
Originally, the land was granted to the McMullen-McGloin colony. Eugenia McGloin gave 5 acres (2.0 ha) for a railroad station that she named Yougeen in 1911. There was a railroad switch and a fun house in the community in 1939. There were two stores there as late as the middle of the 1960s. Since then, the majority of the locals have migrated away; in 2000, there were only a few scattered houses still standing.

== Geography ==
Yougeen is located on U.S. Highway 181, 6 mi (9.7 km) south of Beeville in south-central Bee County.

== Education ==
Yougeen had its own school in 1939. Today, the community is served by the Skidmore-Tynan Independent School District.
