= Mineral, Texas =

- Unincorporated community
- Location within the state of Texas Mineral (the United States)
- Coordinates: 28°32′55″N 97°54′15″W
- Country: United States
- State: Texas
- County: Bee
- Elevation: 335 ft (102 m)
- Time zone: UTC-6 (Central (CST))
  - Summer (DST): UTC-5 (CDT)
- ZIP codes: 78125
- GNIS feature ID: 1362942

Mineral is an unincorporated community in northwestern Bee County, Texas, United States. According to the Handbook of Texas, the community had a population of 50 in 2000. It is located within the Beeville micropolitan area.

== History ==
Mineral's first settler was Ross "Rust" Morris, who moved to the area from Montgomery County, Tennessee, and homesteaded near San Domingo Creek in 1836. Anson Jones then granted 1,000 acres (400 ha) of land to Henry Coley's heirs from Tennessee nine years later. Thomas Malone and Robert Ricks then purchased land from them in 1874. Residents dug wells in the area to find drinkable water, but there was none. It may have been caused by an oil spill in the vicinity or mineral deposits of bones from prehistoric creatures. The water was found to have 16 different minerals in it by William and Susan Sanford. People then started to settle in the community when they were told that the water had "healing powers" in 1877 and was called Mineral City. Many residents lived in tents. There was also a hotel called the Sanford Hotel, churches, a drugstore and other stores, and a gristmill in 1877. A post office was established that next year. The excitement of the water's "healing powers" soon disappeared, most likely because the mineral content decreased when the well deepened in 1889. The word "city" was removed from its name in 1895. The hotel disappeared from county maps in 1896. Agriculture was the most common aspect of community life. It had a population of 100 in 1890. It was almost destroyed by a fire in 1901 and then by a flood two years later. The population grew to 200 in 1916. More oil was discovered in 1930. By the end of the decade, there were three churches, one business, and several scattered homes in Mineral. Its population was 150 until it dropped to 50 in 1949 and remained at that number through 2000. There were a few businesses and two Baptist churches in 1952, along with the establishment of the South Texas Children's Home. It also had two churches and a store in 1990. Its population grew to 65 in 2010. It was said that the hotel is now a private residence.

Although Mineral is unincorporated, it has a post office, with the ZIP code of 78125.

== Geography ==
Mineral is located at the intersection of Farm to Market Roads 623 and 673, 15 mi (24 km) northwest of Beeville, 18 mi (29 km) northeast of Oakville, 8 mi (13 km) southwest of Pettus, and 82 mi (132 km) southeast of San Antonio via U.S. Route 181 in north-central Bee County.

== Education ==
Mineral had its own school in 1887. Another school that was built before 1882 had 99 students in the 1898-1899 school year, while the enrollment grew to 125 in the 1905-1906 school year. It eventually joined with the Pawnee Independent School District. It had a school in the late 1930s. It continues to be served by the Pawnee ISD to this day.
