= Orangedale, Texas =

- Unincorporated community
- Location within Texas Location within the United States
- Coordinates: 28°26′22″N 97°49′34″W
- Country: United States
- State: Texas
- County: Bee
- Elevation: 279 ft (85 m)
- Time zone: UTC-6 (Central (CST))
  - Summer (DST): UTC-5 (CDT)
- Area code: 361
- GNIS feature ID: 1343305

Orangedale is an unincorporated community in Bee County, in the U.S. state of Texas. According to the Handbook of Texas, the community had a population of 35 in 2000. It is located within the Beeville micropolitan area.

== History ==
The settlement took its name from the orange and other fruit trees grown in the town in the early 1900s. At its heights, the town had two schools, a store, and gas station; by 1990 it only had a church.

In 2000, Orangedale had a population of 35.

== Geography ==
Orangedale is located on Farm to Market Road 673, 4 mi (6.4 km) northwest of Beeville in central Bee County.

== Education ==
Orangedale had two schools, one in 1906 and another in 1948. Today, the community is served by the Beeville Independent School District.
