= Monteola, Texas =

- Unincorporated community
- Location within Texas Location within the United States
- Coordinates: 28°41′52″N 97°54′57″W
- Country: United States
- State: Texas
- County: Bee
- Elevation: 489 ft (149 m)
- Time zone: UTC-6 (Central (CST))
  - Summer (DST): UTC-5 (CDT)
- Area code: 361
- GNIS feature ID: 1380205

Monteola is an unincorporated community in Bee County, in the U.S. state of Texas. It is located within the Beeville micropolitan area.

== History ==
The area in what is now known as Monteola today was first settled by Englishman George Cook and his daughter, Eliza, sometime before 1880. It was originally called Butler's Neighborhood for local ranchers L.G. and A.B. Butler in 1883. The first store and gin in the community were operated by Mase Lynch, who renamed the town Monteola for a peddler named Monty and his wife Ola. The store and gin continued to operate in 1939. Residents then left the community, and only a few scattered houses remained in the early 1990s.

== Geography ==
Monteola is located on Farm to Market Road 2985, 24 mi (39 km) north of Beeville in extreme northern Bee County.

== Education ==
Monteola is served by the Pawnee Independent School District.
