= A. C. Jones High School (Beeville, Texas) =

Public school in Texas, United States

Location
- 1902 North Adams Street; Beeville, Bee County, Texas 78102-2796; United States; 28.4195°N 97.7528°W

Information
- School type: Public, high school
- Locale: Town: Distant
- School district: Beeville ISD
- NCES School ID: 480972000442
- Principal: Dr. Steven Edlin
- Faculty: 65.62 (on an FTE basis)
- Grades: 9–12
- Enrollment: 1,021 (2023–2024)
- Student to teacher ratio: 15.56
- Colors: Orange & White
- Athletics conference: UIL Class AAAA
- Mascot: Trojan
- Website: acjoneshs.beevilleisd.net

A. C. Jones High School is a public high school located in Beeville, Texas, United States and classified as a 4A school by the University Interscholastic League (UIL). It is part of the Beeville Independent School District located in central Bee County. As the only comprehensive high school of its district, its boundary includes Beeville and Blue Berry Hill. During 2023–2024, A. C. Jones High School had an enrollment of 1,021 students and a student to teacher ratio of 15.56. The school received an overall rating of "C" from the Texas Education Agency for the 2024–2025 school year.

== Athletics ==
The A.C. Jones Trojans compete in these sports:

- Baseball
- Basketball
- Cross Country
- Football
- Golf
- Powerlifting
- Soccer
- Softball
- Tennis
- Track and Field
- Volleyball
- Wrestling

== Notable alumni ==
- Byron Bradfute, National Football League player
- Edmundo Mireles Jr., FBI agent involved it the 1986 FBI Miami shootout
