= Olmos, Bee County, Texas =

- Unincorporated community
- Location within Texas Location within the United States
- Coordinates: 28°14′30″N 97°49′6″W
- Country: United States
- State: Texas
- County: Bee
- Elevation: 220 ft (67 m)
- Time zone: UTC-6 (Central (CST))
  - Summer (DST): UTC-5 (CDT)
- Area code: 361
- GNIS feature ID: 1378804

Olmos is an unincorporated community in Bee County, in the U.S. state of Texas. According to the Handbook of Texas, the community had no population estimates in 2000. It is located within the Beeville micropolitan area.

== Geography ==
Olmos is located at the intersection of Farm-to-Market Roads 796 and 797, 13 mi (21 km) southwest of Beeville in southwestern Bee County. It is located north of a creek of the same name.

== Education ==
The first school in Olmos was built in 1893. The community continues to be served by the Skidmore-Tynan ISD today.
