= Brown Bellows & Columbia =

American building contractor firm

Brown Bellows & Columbia was an American building contractor firm formed to build the huge U.S. Naval Air Base at Corpus Christi, Texas in 1940, as part of the U.S. buildup prior to its entering World War II. It was a consortium of three firms: Houston-based Brown & Root, Oakland, California-based Columbia Construction, and Houston-based Bellows.

A number of its works are listed on the U.S. National Register of Historic Places.

Works include:

- NAS Chase Field-Building 1001, Independence St., 0.45 mi. S of jct. with TX 202 Beeville, TX (Brown Bellows & Columbia), NRHP-listed
- NAS Chase Field-Building 1009, Essex St. 0.68 mi. SSE of the jct. of TX 202 and Independence St. Beeville, TX (Brown Bellows & Company), NRHP-listed
- NAS Chase Field-Building 1015, Byrd St. 0.82 mi. SSE of jct. of TX 202 and Independence St. Beeville, TX (Brown Bellows & Columbia), NRHP-listed
- NAS Chase Field-Building 1040, Enterprise St. 0.37 mi. SSE of the jct. of TX 202 and Independence St. Beeville, TX (Brown Bellows & Columbia), NRHP-listed
- NAS Chase Field-Building 1042, Ofstie Rd. 0.6 mi. SSE of the jct. of TX 202 and Independence St. Beeville, TX (Brown Bellows & Columbia), NRHP-listed
- NAS Chase Field-Quarters R, Essex St. 0.43 mi. SSW of the jct. of TX 202 and Independence St. Beeville, TX (Brown Bellows & Columbia), NRHP-listed
- NAS Chase Field-Quarters S, Essex St. 0.45 mi. SSW of the jct. of TX 202 and Independence St. Beeville, TX (Brown Bellows & Columbia), NRHP-listed

The firm was sued in 1943 under the National Labor Relations Act and appeared before the National Labor Relations Board; the complaint was dismissed under appeal.
