= Blanconia, Texas =

- Unincorporated community
- Location within Texas Location within the United States
- Coordinates: 28°23′55″N 97°24′44″W
- Country: United States
- State: Texas
- County: Bee
- Elevation: 85 ft (26 m)
- Time zone: UTC-6 (Central (CST))
  - Summer (DST): UTC-5 (CDT)
- Area code: 361
- GNIS feature ID: 1378017

Blanconia is an unincorporated community in Bee County, in the U.S. state of Texas. According to the Handbook of Texas, the community had a population of 100 in 2010. It is located within the Beeville micropolitan area.

== Education ==
In 1905, Blanconia had a school with one teacher and 12 students. Today, the community is served by the Refugio Independent School District.
