= Bainville, Texas =

Unincorporated community in Texas, US

Bainville
- Unincorporated community
- Location in Texas
- Coordinates: 28.7455383°N 97.9327803°W
- Country: United States
- State: Texas
- County: Karnes
- Elevation: 466 ft (142 m)

Bainville is an unincorporated community in Karnes County, Texas, United States. Situated on Texas State Highway 72, it is named for local shopkeeper J. L. Bain, who moved there in the 1920s. Mostly populated by Swedes from Travis County, its population was about 60 from the early 1940s to the early 1960s. As of 2000, it had 8 residents.
