= Clareville =

Clareville may refer to:

- Clareville House, England
- Clareville, New South Wales, Australia
- Clareville railway station, New Zealand
- Clareville, Texas, United States
