= Papalote, Texas =

- Unincorporated community
- Location within Texas Location within the United States
- Coordinates: 28°10′21″N 97°36′07″W
- Country: United States
- State: Texas
- County: Bee
- Elevation: 89 ft (27 m)
- Time zone: UTC-6 (Central (CST))
  - Summer (DST): UTC-5 (CDT)
- Area code: 361
- GNIS feature ID: 1378831

Papalote is an unincorporated community in Bee County, in the U.S. state of Texas. According to the Handbook of Texas, the community had a population of 70 in 2000. It is located within the Beeville micropolitan area.

== History ==
Papalote was first settled on Papalote Creek after land grants were given by Mexico to its early settlers. The area was split into three settlements: Lower, Central, and Upper Papalote, but the three merged into one settlement around the mid-1880s.

== Education ==
Several schools were established throughout Papalote's history, such as schools in Lower Papalote. It is currently part of the Skidmore-Tynan Independent School District.
