= Texas State Highway 202 =

State highway Bee and Refugio counties in Texas, United States

State Highway 202
- SH 202, highlighted in red

Route information
- Maintained by TxDOT
- Length: 29.767 mi (47.905 km)
- Existed: 1939–present

Major junctions
- West end: Future I-69W / US 59 / Bus. US 181 in Beeville
- US 181 in Beeville
- East end: US 183 / US 77 Alt. in Refugio

Location
- Country: United States
- State: Texas
- Counties: Bee, Refugio

Highway system
- Highways in Texas; Interstate; US; State; Former; Toll; Loops; Spurs; FM/RM; Park; Rec
← SH 201	→ SH 203

State Highway 202 (SH 202) is a 29.767-mile (47.905 km) state highway in Bee and Refugio counties in Texas, United States, that connects U.S. Route 50 (US 59) in Beeville with U.S. Route 183 / U.S. Route 77 Alternate (US 183 / US 77 Alt.), north of Refugio.

== Route description ==
SH 202 begins at a junction with US 59 (LLoyd Benson Highway / Houston Street / Future I-69W) in the center of Beeville. SH 202 heads south along South Washington Street from this junction through Beeville briefly concurrent with U.S. Route 181 Business (US 181 Bus.) until the two split, with US 181 Bus. heading south and SH 202 heading east. SH 202 continues to the east through Beeville to an intersection with Farm to Market Road 351. Heading towards the east, the SH 202 continues to a junction with U.S. Route 181. The highway continues to the east to an intersection with Farm to Market Road 2441. SH 202 reaches its eastern terminus at US 183 / US 77 Alt. north of Refugio.

== History ==
SH 202 was designated on January 9, 1934 from George West to Beeville as a restoration of the easternmost portion of the old Texas State Highway 127 (which was reused on another road in 1932). On November 19, 1935, it was extended west to Fowlerton. On December 21, 1936, it was extended east to Refugio. By 1938, SH 202 was extended west to Cotulla (restoring more of the old SH 127) and east to Refugio. On September 26, 1939, the section of SH 202 west of George West was transferred to SH 72. On October 30, 1939, before signage was changed, SH 202 was extended to Laredo, replacing SH 257 (note that SH 202 east of George West was to be transferred to SH 257 on September 26, 1939). On August 24, 1954, the section from Laredo to Beeville became the new routing of U.S. Route 59, and was pared back to its present routing.

== Junction list ==
County	Location	mi	km	Destinations	Notes
Bee	Beeville	0.000	0.000	Bus. US 181 north (South Washington Street) – FM 351, US 181	Continuation north from western terminus
Bee	Beeville	0.000	0.000	US 59 north (Lloyd Benson Highway / East Houston Street) – Goliad, Houston US 59 south (Lloyd Benson Highway / West Houston Street) – George West, Freer	Western teriminus; western end of US 181 Bus. concurrency; US 59 is the future Interstate 69W
Bee	Beeville			Bus. US 181 south (Cato Street) – FM 888, FM 351, US 181	Eastern end of US 181 Bus. concurrency
Bee	Beeville			FM 351 north (East Regan Road) – US 181 Bus., US 59, US 181 Bus., US 181	Southern end of FM 351
Bee				US 181 north – Kenedy, Karnes City, San Antonio US 181 south – Sinton, Corpus Christi	Diamond interchange
Bee				FM 2441 south – Woodsboro	Western end of FM 2441 concurrency T intersection
Bee				FM 2441 north – Goliad	Eastern end of FM 2441 concurrency T intersection
Refugio		29.767	47.905	US 183 north / US 77 Alt. north – Goliad US 183 south / US 77 Alt. south – Refugio, Sinton	Eastern terminus; T intersection
1.000 mi = 1.609 km; 1.000 km = 0.621 mi: Concurrency terminus

== See also ==
- List of state highways in Texas
