= Byron Bradfute =

American football player (1937–2020)

No. 77
- Position: Offensive tackle

Personal information
- Born: December 12, 1937; Beeville, Texas, U.S.
- Died: October 30, 2020 (aged 82); New Braunfels, Texas, U.S.
- Listed height: 6 ft 3 in (1.91 m)
- Listed weight: 243 lb (110 kg)

Career information
- High school: A. C. Jones (TX)
- College: Southern Mississippi; Abilene Christian
- AFL draft: 1960

Career history
- Dallas Cowboys (1960–1961)

Career statistics
- Games played: 17
- Stats at Pro Football Reference

Byron Gilbert Bradfute (December 12, 1937 – October 30, 2020) was an American football offensive tackle in the National Football League for the Dallas Cowboys. He played college football at the University of Southern Mississippi and Abilene Christian University.

== Early life ==
Bradfute attended A. C. Jones High School, where he was a two-time All-district selection at tackle.

Bradfute accepted a scholarship from Abilene Christian University. As a junior, he was thrown out of the team for drinking beer. Bradfute finished his senior season at the University of Southern Mississippi.

== Professional career ==
Bradfute was selected by the Los Angeles Chargers in the 1960 AFL draft, but instead chose to sign with the NFL's Dallas Cowboys as a free agent.

Bradfute was a reserve offensive tackle and was a part of the franchise's inaugural season. The next year, he played in five games after suffering an injury. On July 29, 1962, Bradfute announced his retirement.

== Death ==
Bradfute died from COVID-19 on October 30, 2020, amidst the COVID-19 pandemic in Texas.
