= Normanna, Texas =

Census-designated place in Bee County, Texas, United States

- Census-designated place
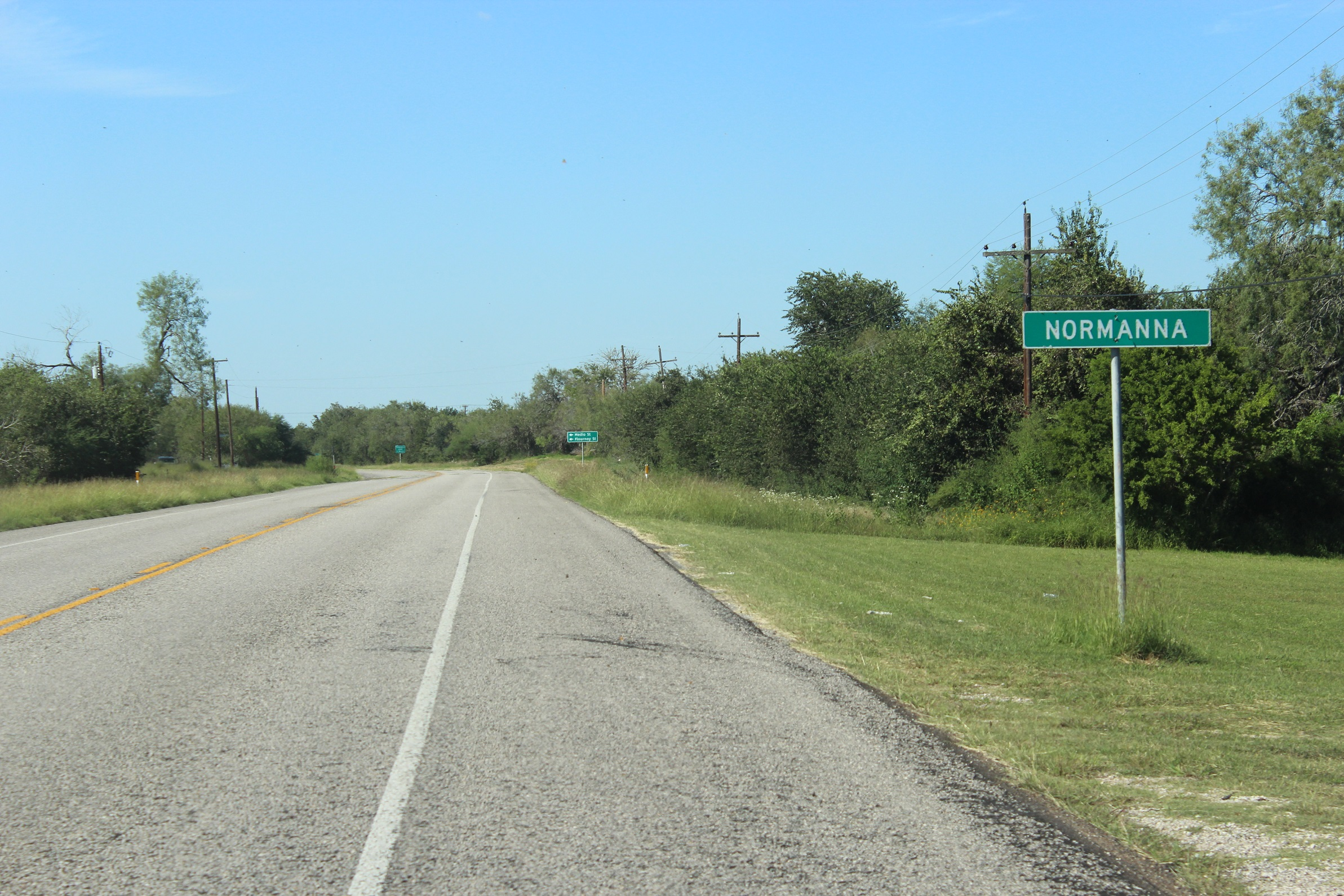
- Southbound on U.S. Route 181 entering Normanna, August 2015

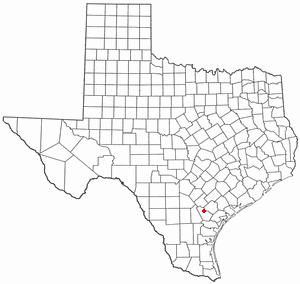
- Location of Normanna, Texas

- Coordinates: 28°31′44″N 97°47′1″W
- Country: United States
- State: Texas
- County: Bee

Area
  - Total: 1.4 sq mi (3.5 km^{2})
  - Land: 1.4 sq mi (3.5 km^{2})
  - Water: 0 sq mi (0.0 km^{2})
- Elevation: 269 ft (82 m)

Population (2020)
  - Total: 98
  - Density: 73/sq mi (28/km^{2})
- Time zone: UTC-6 (Central (CST))
  - Summer (DST): UTC-5 (CDT)
- ZIP code: 78142
- Area code: 361
- FIPS code: 48-51852
- GNIS feature ID: 1381021

Normanna is a census-designated place (CDP) in Bee County, Texas, United States. The population was 98 at the 2020 census.

== Geography ==
Normanna is located in northern Bee County at 28°31′44″N 97°47′1″W (28.528761, -97.783742). U.S. Route 181 passes through the center of the CDP, leading southward 9 miles (14 km) to Beeville, the county seat, and northward 21 miles (34 km) to Kenedy.

According to the United States Census Bureau, the CDP has a total area of 1.4 square miles (3.5 km^{2}), all land.

== Climate ==
The climate in this area is characterized by hot, humid summers and generally mild to cool winters. According to the Köppen Climate Classification system, Normanna has a humid subtropical climate, abbreviated "Cfa" on climate maps.

== Demographics ==
Historical population
Census	Pop.	Note	%±
2000	121		—
2010	113		−6.6%
2020	98		−13.3%
U.S. Decennial Census; 1850–1900 1910; 1920 1930 1940; 1950 1960 1970; 1980 1990 2000; 2010 2020

Normanna was first listed as a census designated place in the 2000 U.S. census.

Normanna CDP, Texas – Racial and ethnic composition Note: the US Census treats Hispanic/Latino as an ethnic category. This table excludes Latinos from the racial categories and assigns them to a separate category. Hispanics/Latinos may be of any race.
Race / Ethnicity (NH = Non-Hispanic)	Pop 2000	Pop 2010	Pop 2020	% 2000	% 2010	% 2020
White alone (NH)	64	53	38	52.89%	46.90%	38.78%
Black or African American alone (NH)	5	3	0	4.13%	2.65%	0.00%
Native American or Alaska Native alone (NH)	0	0	0	0.00%	0.00%	0.00%
Asian alone (NH)	0	0	0	0.00%	0.00%	0.00%
Pacific Islander alone (NH)	0	0	0	0.00%	0.00%	0.00%
Other race alone (NH)	0	0	0	0.00%	0.00%	0.00%
Mixed race or Multiracial (NH)	0	2	8	0.00%	1.77%	8.16%
Hispanic or Latino (any race)	52	55	52	42.98%	48.67%	53.06%
Total	121	113	98	100.00%	100.00%	100.00%

=== 2000 census ===
As of the census of 2000, there were 121 people, 61 households, and 30 families residing in the CDP. The population density was 91.1 inhabitants per square mile (35.2/km^{2}). There were 76 housing units at an average density of 57.2 per square mile (22.1/km^{2}). The racial makeup of the CDP was 83.47% White, 4.13% African American, 12.40% from other races. Hispanic or Latino of any race were 42.98% of the population.

There were 61 households, out of which 24.6% had children under the age of 18 living with them, 39.3% were married couples living together, 8.2% had a female householder with no husband present, and 49.2% were non-families. 44.3% of all households were made up of individuals, and 18.0% had someone living alone who was 65 years of age or older. The average household size was 1.98 and the average family size was 2.84.

In the CDP, the population was spread out, with 22.3% under the age of 18, 5.8% from 18 to 24, 25.6% from 25 to 44, 24.0% from 45 to 64, and 22.3% who were 65 years of age or older. The median age was 41 years. For every 100 females, there were 101.7 males. For every 100 females age 18 and over, there were 95.8 males.

The median income for a household in the CDP was $19,063, and the median income for a family was $28,125. Males had a median income of $25,156 versus $16,250 for females. The per capita income for the CDP was $15,954. There were 6.5% of families and 10.0% of the population living below the poverty line, including no under eighteens and 7.9% of those over 64.

== Education ==
Normanna is served by the Pettus Independent School District.

== See also ==
- List of census-designated places in Texas
