= Naval Air Station Chase Field =

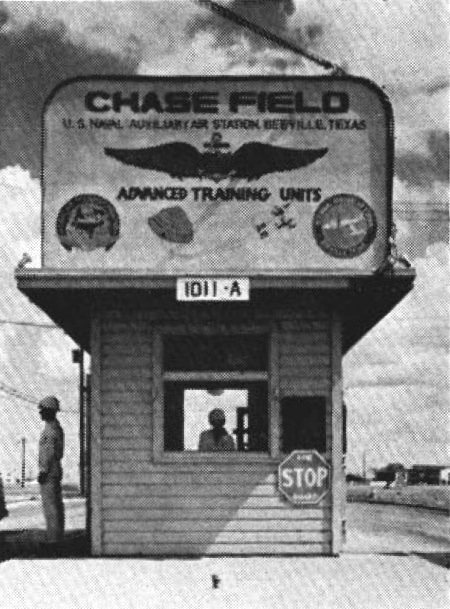
- IATA: NIR; ICAO: KNIR

Summary
- Airport type: Military
- Location: Bee County, Texas (Beeville postal address)
- Elevation AMSL: 190 ft / 58 m
- Coordinates: 28°21′51.69″N 97°39′35.32″W
- Interactive map of Naval Air Station Chase Field

Naval Air Station Chase Field is a former naval air station located in unincorporated Bee County, Texas, near Beeville. It was named for Lieutenant Commander Nathan Brown Chase, Naval Aviator #37, who died in 1925 while developing carrier landing techniques for the U.S. Navy.

Seven buildings of the station are individually listed on the U.S. National Register of Historic Places: NAS Chase Field-Building 1001, NAS Chase Field-Building 1009, NAS Chase Field-Building 1015, NAS Chase Field-Building 1040, NAS Chase Field-Building 1042, NAS Chase Field-Quarters R, and NAS Chase Field-Quarters S.

== History ==
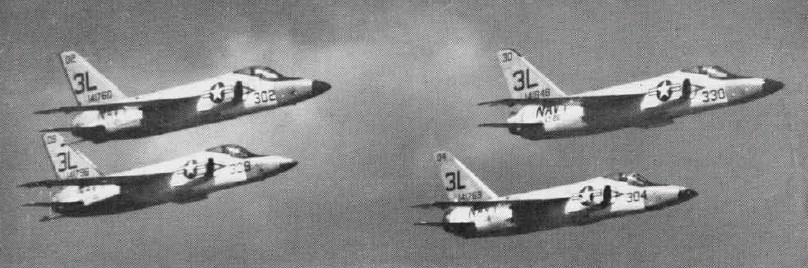

Originally under construction as Beeville Municipal Airport, it was leased in 1943 by the U.S. Navy to satisfy the increasing demand for trained pilots necessitated by World War II. Not initially intended to be a permanent base, it closed in July 1946. In August 1952, it was then purchased by the Navy to again relieve congestion at Naval Air Station Corpus Christi in preparation for the Korean War. Jet training began there in 1954. It operated as Chase Field until 1968, when it was redesignated as a full Naval Air Station to meet the demand for pilot training during the Vietnam War. It was tasked with preparing U.S. Navy and U.S. Marine Corps Student Naval Aviators to be strike pilots in sea-based jet fighter and attack aircraft. Training for selected NATO and Allied student jet aviators was also conducted at NAS Chase Field.

In the early 1990s, the Base Realignment and Closure Commission (BRAC) decided that NAS Chase Field would be shuttered. At the time of its closure in 1993, it was home to Training Air Wing Three (tail code "C"), part of Naval Air Training Command, with training squadrons VT-24 Bobcats, VT-25 Cougars, and VT-26 Tigers flying the T-2C Buckeye and TA-4J Skyhawk II jet trainers. The wing was disestablished on 31 Aug 1992, prior to the closure of the base. After its closure, the installation was redeveloped into Chase Field Industrial Complex.

== See also ==
- List of airports in Texas
