= Chase Field Industrial Complex =

Former naval air station in Texas, US

Coordinates: 28°21′51.69″N 97°39′35.32″W

Chase Field Industrial Complex (FAA LID: 1XA2), formerly Naval Air Station Chase Field, is a former naval air station located in unincorporated Bee County, Texas, near Beeville, Texas. The Texas Department of Criminal Justice operates a group of facilities collectively referred to as the Chase Field Criminal Justice Center on the grounds of the former air station.

The TDCJ facilities include the Correctional Institutions Division Region IV Office, two transfer facilities (Garza East Unit and Garza West Unit), and the Beeville Distribution Center.
