= U.S. Route 181 =

Highway in Texas, United States

U.S. Route 181
- US 181 highlighted in red

Route information
- Auxiliary route of US 81
- Length: 136.76 mi (220.09 km)
- Existed: 1927–present

Major junctions
- South end: I-37 / SH 35 / SH 286 at Corpus Christi
- Future I-69E / US 77 in Sinton; Future I-69W / US 59 in Beeville
- North end: I-37 near San Antonio

Location
- Country: United States
- Counties: Nueces, San Patricio, Bee, Karnes, Wilson, Bexar

Highway system
- United States Numbered Highway System; List; Special; Divided

U.S. Highway 181 is a south–north U.S. Highway located entirely in the state of Texas. Both termini are at Interstate 37 (I-37), the road that it mainly parallels to the east. Its southern terminus is at I-37 in Corpus Christi near the Gulf of Mexico. Its northern terminus is at I-37 on the south side of San Antonio; prior to the Interstate era, US 181 traveled into Downtown San Antonio along Presa Street to an intersection with its parent route, US 81, which then ran along Alamo Street.

== Route description ==
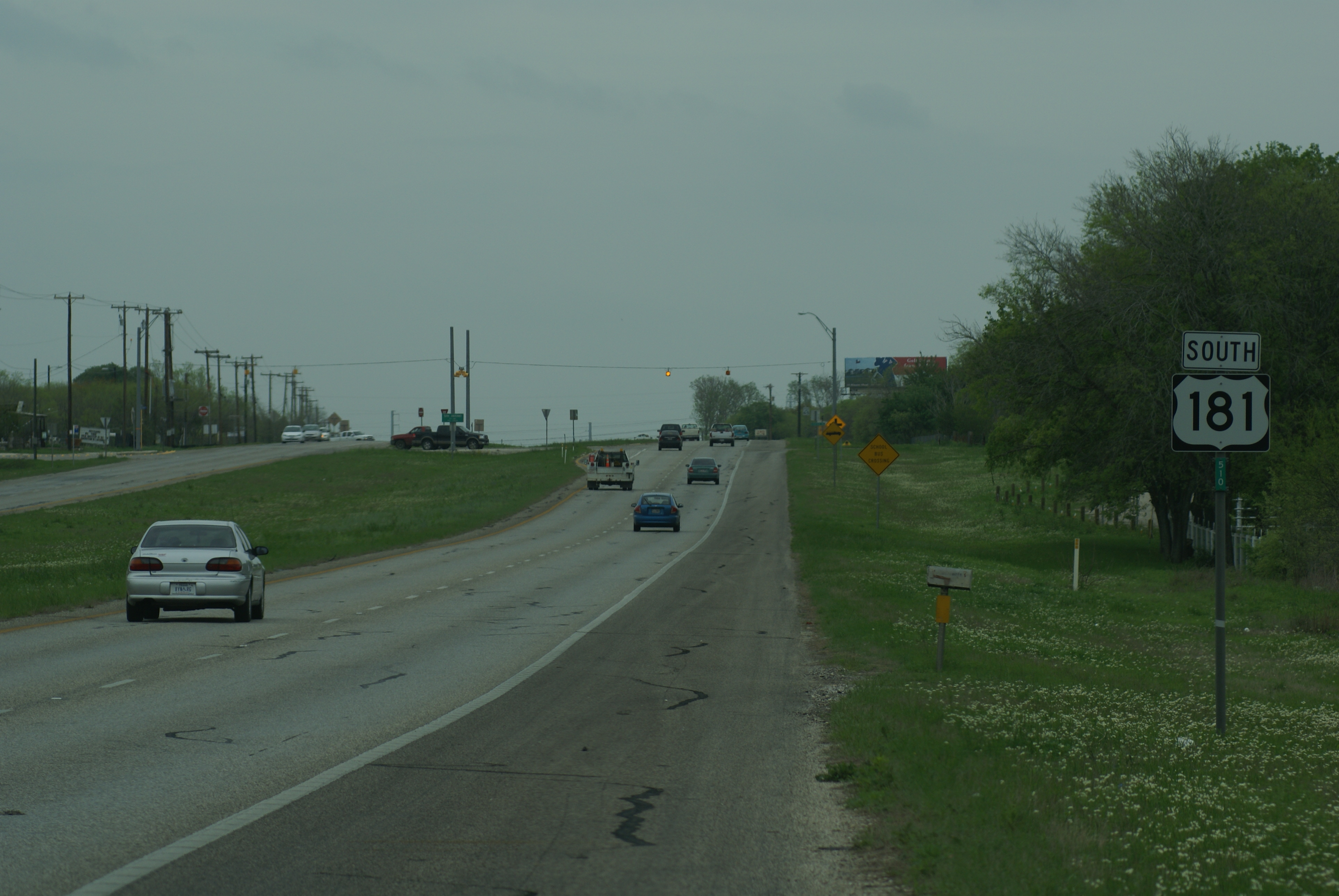
US 181 near its northern terminus southeast of San Antonio, Texas.

The southern terminus of US 181 is in Corpus Christi, at I-37; the interchange also serves SH 286. US 181 travels northeast as a freeway, concurrent with SH 35, providing access to the Port of Corpus Christi. The two routes traverse the New Harbor Bridge over the Nueces Bay Causeway, crossing from Nueces County into San Patricio County and the city of Portland. In Gregory, SH 35 splits to the east toward Aransas Pass, while US 181 turns to the northwest as a divided highway toward Taft and Sinton, where it intersects US 77 (future I-69E). North of the community of St. Paul, US 181 enters Bee County; it passes through Skidmore, where it intersects SH 359, before reaching Beeville. US 181 bypasses the city as a freeway to the east, intersecting US 59 (future I-69W), while the old alignment through the city serves as a business route. Continuing north, the highway passes through the communities of Normana, Tuleta, and Pettus, before crossing into Karnes County, reaching Kenedy and then Karnes City. US 181 runs on the west side of both cities, while business routes serve their respective downtown areas. Turning more to the northwest, US 181 passes through Falls City before crossing into Wilson County and reaching Poth. It subsequently passes through the eastern part of Floresville; the old route through the center of the city remains part of the state highway system as Loop 181. Entering Bexar County, US 181 passes through Elmendorf, intersecting Loop 1604 near the city limits and the south shore of Calaveras Lake. Approximately 6 miles (9.7 km) to the northwest, US 181 reaches its northern terminus at another interchange with I-37, just south of that route's interchange with I-410 and US 281, on the south side of San Antonio.

== History ==
US 181 is one of the original routes accepted by AASHO (now AASHTO) in November 1926. Its original northern terminus was at a junction with its parent, US 81, and US 90 in Downtown San Antonio. By 1968, the portion between Downtown and Loop 13 had been removed from the state highway system. The completion of I-37 in San Antonio during the 1970s resulted in the truncation of US 181 to its interchange with that freeway, although the AASHTO route log in 1989 stated that US 181 extended northward along I-37 to a common northern terminus at I-35/US 281. The segment north of this point along Presa Street was transferred to Spur 122.

In 2003, TxDOT began studies to replace the Corpus Christi Harbor Bridge due to maintenance and safety issues as well as to provide long-term access to the Port of Corpus Christi to larger ship vessels (including Panamax). Construction of the New Harbor Bridge began on August 8, 2016. The alignment of the new bridge, which lies west of the old bridge, begins at the northern terminus of SH 286 (exit 1C on I-37) and crosses the Corpus Christi Ship Channel before merging with the current US 181 alignment. Construction was scheduled for completion by spring 2020, but was extensively delayed due to engineering and design issues. Construction was completed in June 2025; the southbound lanes opened to motorists on June 28, shifting the southern terminus of US 181 to the interchange of I-37 and SH 286, while the northbound lanes opened on July 8. With the completion of the new bridge, the old Harbor Bridge was slated for demolition and is currently being demolish.

== Major intersections ==
County	Location	mi	km	Destinations	Notes
Nueces	Corpus Christi			SH 286 south (Crosstown Expressway)	South end of SH 35 concurrency
Nueces	Corpus Christi			Downtown / SEA District / Staples Street	Southbound exit and northbound entrance
Nueces	Corpus Christi			I-37 north – San Antonio, Airport	Southbound exit and northbound entrance
Nueces	Corpus Christi			Harbor Bridge Project over Corpus Christi Channel	
Nueces	Corpus Christi			Burleson Street - Joe Fulton Int'l Trade Corridor	Southbound exit and northbound entrance
Nueces	Corpus Christi			Beach Avenue	
Nueces Bay				Nueces Bay Causeway	
San Patricio	Portland			Indian Point Park	
San Patricio	Portland			Frontage Road	southbound access only
San Patricio	Portland			FM 893 (Moore Avenue)	no direct southbound exit (signed at FM 2986)
San Patricio	Portland			FM 2986 (Wildcat Drive)	
San Patricio	Portland			Lang Road	southbound exit only
San Patricio	Portland			FM 3239 (Northshore Boulevard) / Buddy Ganem Drive	
San Patricio				Gregory	northbound access only
San Patricio	Gregory			SH 35 north – Aransas Pass, Rockport	Interchange; northbound exit and southbound entrance; north end of SH 35 concurrency
San Patricio	Gregory			Childress Street / Sunset Road	Southbound exit and northbound entrance
San Patricio				SH 35 north / SH 361 south (via Spur 202) – Aransas Pass, Ingleside, Port Aransas	Interchange; north end of freeway
San Patricio	Taft			FM 631 east	South end of FM 631 concurrency
San Patricio	Taft			FM 631 west (Davis Road) – Odem	South end of FM 631 concurrency
San Patricio				FM 1074 south	
San Patricio	Sinton			SH 89 north / SH 188 east to Future I-69E / US 77 – Rockport, Refugio, Beeville	Interchange; south end of SH 188 concurrency
San Patricio	Sinton			FM 2046 south (Sodville Avenue)	
San Patricio	Sinton			Bus. US 77 north (Vineyard Avenue) – Calallen, Corpus Christi	South end of US 77 Bus. concurrency
San Patricio	Sinton			Bus. US 77 south (San Patricio Street) / SH 188 west (Sinton Street) – Mathis, Victoria	North end of US 77 Bus. and SH 188 concurrencies
San Patricio	Sinton			Future I-69E / US 77 – Corpus Christi, Calallen, Victoria, Refugio	interchange; U.S. 77 is the future Interstate 69E
San Patricio	Sinton			SH 89 south – Refugio, Rockport, Gregory	interchange
San Patricio	St. Paul			FM 3089 west	
Bee	Skidmore			SH 359 west to I-37 – Mathis, Alice, Lake Corpus Christi State Recreational Area	
Bee	Skidmore			FM 797 west (Main Street)	
Bee				Bus. US 181 north – Kenedy	interchange; south end of freeway
Bee				Emily Drive south	northbound exit only
Bee				SH 202 – Refugio, George West	
Bee	Beeville			Future I-69W / US 59 – Laredo, George West, Victoria, Goliad	U.S. 59 is the future Interstate 69W
Bee				FM 351 south – George West, Sinton	
Bee				FM 3355 (Charco Road)	interchange; north end of freeway
Bee				Bus. US 181 south – Sinton	
Bee	Tuleta			FM 1465 west to FM 623 – Mineral	
Bee	Pettus			FM 623 – Mineral	
Bee	Tulsita			FM 798 west – Pawnee	
Karnes				FM 743 north to FM 623 west / FM 1348 west – Kenedy, Pettus	
Karnes	Green			FM 2509 north – Kenedy	
Karnes				FM 632 east (Allen B. Polunsky Drive) – TDCJ Connally Unit	
Karnes				Bus. US 181 north to FM 2509 – Karnes City, Pettus	
Karnes	Kenedy			FM 1145 / SH 72 Truck east – truck route to SH 239 east / FM 792, Three Rivers, Goliad, Cuero	south end of SH 72 Truck overlap
Karnes	Kenedy			SH 72 / SH 239 east – Three Rivers, Goliad, Cuero	north end of SH 72 Truck overlap
Karnes	Kenedy			FM 719 east to FM 792 – Helena	
Karnes	Kenedy			Bus. US 181 south – Pettus	
Karnes	Karnes City			SH 80 north / SH 123 north (US 181 Bus. north) – Seguin, Floresville, San Marcos, Luling	
Karnes	Karnes City			FM 1353	
Karnes	Karnes City			FM 99 – Coy City, Peggy, Whitsett	
Karnes	Karnes City			Bus. US 181 south / FM 1144 west – Floresville, Peggy	
Karnes	Hobson			FM 81 east – Panna Maria, Runge	South end of FM 81 concurrency
Karnes	Hobson			FM 81 west	North end of FM 81 concurrency
Karnes	Falls City			FM 791 west (West Maverick Street) – Campbellton	
Karnes	Falls City			FM 887 west to FM 791 – Campbellton	South end of FM 887 concurrency
Karnes	Falls City			FM 887 east – Pawelekville, Gillett	North end of FM 887 concurrency
Wilson	Poth			FM 541 to I-37 – McCoy, Kosciusko	
Wilson	Poth			FM 427 north to FM 537 – Stockdale	
Wilson				FM 537 east – Stockdale	
Wilson				Loop 181 north (Sgt. Hugo Lange Loop) – Floresville Business District, Pleasanton, San Antonio	
Wilson	Floresville			SH 97 west (Hospital Boulevard) to US 281 – Pleasanton, Jourdanton	South end of SH 97 concurrency
Wilson	Floresville			SH 97 east / FM 536 west (Standish Street) to US 281 – Stockdale, Espey	North end of SH 97 concurrency
Wilson				Loop 181 south (Sgt. Hugo Lange Loop) – Floresville Business District, Pleasanton, Karnes City	
Wilson	Calaveras			FM 775 – La Vernia	
Bexar				Loop 1604 (Anderson Loop) – Elmendorf, Converse	interchange
Bexar				CPS Energy Calaveras Power Station	interchange
Bexar	San Antonio			Spur 122 north (South Presa Street)	
Bexar	San Antonio			I-37 north – San Antonio	I-37 exit 132
1.000 mi = 1.609 km; 1.000 km = 0.621 mi: Concurrency terminus

== Auxiliary routes ==
US 181 has business routes in Beeville, Kenedy, and Karnes City. The routes are previous alignments of US 181 through these cities, and were previously designated in the state highway system with other route numbers. The designations were changed to Business US 181 by TxDOT in 1991. A de facto fourth route, along a former alignment through Floresville, is designated Loop 181.

=== Beeville business route ===

Business US 181 in Beeville travels through central Beeville while mainline US 181 uses a freeway bypass to the east of the city. It is officially designated by TxDOT as Business US 181-J, and was designated as Loop 516 on May 31, 1973 (which was signed as a business route of US 181), but was changed to Business US 181-J on June 21, 1990.

=== Kenedy business route ===
Business US 181 in Kenedy travels through central Kenedy while mainline US 181 passes to the west of the city. It is officially inventoried by TxDOT as two separate routes, with a discontinuity at SH 72.

- The southern segment, from US 181 northward to SH 72, is designated as Business US 181-G, and was formerly Spur 259 from September 25, 1952, until June 21, 1990, but was signed as business US 181.

- The northern segment, from SH 72 northward to US 181, is designated as Business US 181-F, and was formerly Spur 258 from September 25, 1952, until June 21, 1990, but was signed as business US 181.

Although not officially concurrent with SH 72, the signage in the area directs traffic from one segment to the other, effectively completing the loop.

=== Karnes City business route ===
Business US 181 in Karnes City travels northward and then westward through central Karnes City while mainline US 181 skirts the southwestern edge of the city. It is officially inventoried by TxDOT as two separate routes, which connect at the intersection with SH 80 / SH 123 in the east side of the city.

- The southern segment, from US 181 northward to SH 80/123, is designated as Business US 181-E. The route was previously part of SH 80, but it still signed as SH 80/123 to facilitate access to SH 80/123 for traffic from northbound US 181.
- The northern segment, from SH 80/123 westward to US 181, is designated as Business US 181-D. The route was previously part of FM 1144.

=== Floresville Loop 181 ===
US 181's former alignment in Floresville is inventoried as Loop 181 by TxDOT. The route was designated on October 15, 1946, when US 181 was realigned to the east. The route begins north of the city limits; within the city, it has a brief concurrency with FM 536 and intersects SH 97 before rejoining US 181 in the southeastern section of the city.

== See also ==
=== Related routes ===
- U.S. Highway 81
- U.S. Highway 281
- Interstate 37
