= Clareville, Texas =

- Unincorporated community
- Location within Texas Location within the United States
- Coordinates: 28°19′21″N 97°52′16″W
- Country: United States
- State: Texas
- County: Bee
- Elevation: 272 ft (83 m)
- Time zone: UTC-6 (Central (CST))
  - Summer (DST): UTC-5 (CDT)
- Area code: 361
- GNIS feature ID: 1378125

Clareville is an unincorporated community in Bee County, in the U.S. state of Texas. According to the Handbook of Texas, the community had a population of 23 in 2000. It is located within the Beeville micropolitan area.

== Geography ==
Clareville is located at the intersection of U.S. Highway 59 and Farm-to-Market Roads 796, 323, and 332, 10 mi (16 km) west of Beeville in southwestern Bee County.

== Education ==
Clareville had a school with one teacher and 49 students in the 1898–1899 school year. It joined the Skidmore-Tynan Independent School District in 1940. The community continues to be served by Skidmore-Tynan ISD today.
