= Blue Berry Hill, Texas =

- Census-designated place
- Coordinates: 28°23′21″N 97°46′54″W
- Country: United States
- State: Texas
- County: Bee

Area
  - Total: 2.9 sq mi (7.6 km^{2})
  - Land: 2.9 sq mi (7.6 km^{2})
  - Water: 0 sq mi (0.0 km^{2})
- Elevation: 272 ft (83 m)

Population (2020)
  - Total: 844
  - Density: 290/sq mi (110/km^{2})
- Time zone: UTC-6 (Central (CST))
  - Summer (DST): UTC-5 (CDT)
- Zip Code: 78102
- FIPS code: 48-08830
- GNIS feature ID: 1852687

Blueberry Hill is a census-designated place (CDP) in Bee County, Texas, United States. The population was 844 at the 2020 census. It is located just outside Beeville and has no services of its own. Drinking water and garbage services are provided by the city of Beeville. Mailing addresses for Blueberry Hill are labeled "Beeville".

== Geography ==
Blueberry Hill is located southwest of Beeville at 28°23′21″N 97°46′54″W (28.389303, -97.781611). U.S. Route 59 forms the southern edge of the CDP; the highway leads west 21 miles (34 km) to George West and northeast through Beeville 32 miles (51 km) to Goliad. The northeastern edge of the CDP is formed by the 351 Bypass around Beeville. Beeville is a small town, approximately one hour 45 minutes southeast of San Antonio.

According to the United States Census Bureau, the CDP has a total area of 2.9 square miles (7.6 km^{2}), all land.

== Demographics ==
Historical population
Census	Pop.	Note	%±
2000	982		—
2010	866		−11.8%
2020	844		−2.5%
U.S. Decennial Census; 1850–1900 1910; 1920 1930 1940; 1950 1960 1970; 1980 1990 2000; 2010 2020

Blue Berry Hill was first listed as a census designated place in the 2000 U.S. census.

Blue Berry Hill CDP, Texas – Racial and ethnic composition Note: the US Census treats Hispanic/Latino as an ethnic category. This table excludes Latinos from the racial categories and assigns them to a separate category. Hispanics/Latinos may be of any race.
Race / Ethnicity (NH = Non-Hispanic)	Pop 2000	Pop 2010	Pop 2020	% 2000	% 2010	% 2020
White alone (NH)	178	135	111	18.13%	15.59%	13.15%
Black or African American alone (NH)	2	8	8	0.20%	0.92%	0.95%
Native American or Alaska Native alone (NH)	1	1	0	0.10%	0.12%	0.00%
Asian alone (NH)	2	5	3	0.20%	0.58%	0.36%
Pacific Islander alone (NH)	0	0	0	0.00%	0.00%	0.00%
Other race alone (NH)	0	2	5	0.00%	0.23%	0.59%
Mixed race or Multiracial (NH)	9	2	1	0.92%	0.23%	0.12%
Hispanic or Latino (any race)	790	713	716	80.45%	82.33%	84.83%
Total	982	866	844	100.00%	100.00%	100.00%

=== 2000 census ===
As of the census of 2000, there were 982 people, 316 households, and 238 families residing in the CDP. The population density was 335.6 inhabitants per square mile (129.6/km^{2}). There were 370 housing units at an average density of 126.4 per square mile (48.8/km^{2}). The racial makeup of the CDP was 66.60% White, 0.20% African American, 1.02% Native American, 0.20% Asian, 30.24% from other races, and 1.73% from two or more races. Hispanic or Latino of any race were 80.45% of the population.

There were 316 households, out of which 40.2% had children under the age of 18 living with them, 52.5% were married couples living together, 17.4% had a female householder with no husband present, and 24.4% were non-families. 16.1% of all households were made up of individuals, and 5.7% had someone living alone who was 65 years of age or older. The average household size was 3.11 and the average family size was 3.54.

In the CDP, the population was spread out, with 34.0% under the age of 18, 11.4% from 18 to 24, 27.0% from 25 to 44, 19.9% from 45 to 64, and 7.7% who were 65 years of age or older. The median age was 29 years. For every 100 females, there were 101.6 males. For every 100 females age 18 and over, there were 97.0 males.

The median income for a household in the CDP was $26,500, and the median income for a family was $26,250. Males had a median income of $27,273 versus $16,912 for females. The per capita income for the CDP was $9,255. About 39.5% of families and 45.3% of the population were below the poverty line, including 67.7% of those under age 18 and 21.7% of those age 65 or over.

== Education ==
Blueberry Hill is served by the Beeville Independent School District.
