= Garza East Unit =

Correctional transfer unit in unincorporated Bee County, Texas

Coordinates: 28°22′43″N 97°39′33″W

Garza East Unit is a correctional transfer unit on the grounds of Chase Field Industrial Complex in unincorporated Bee County, Texas, near Beeville. It is co-located with the Garza West Unit.

The facility is operated by the Correctional Institutions Division of the Texas Department of Criminal Justice, administered as within Region IV.

The facility is classified as a Transfer Facility that housed adult male inmates convicted of felonies and state jail felonies. The inmates are housed temporarily after their transfer from county jails and are held no longer than two years, as per Texas Department of Criminal Justice policy.

== History ==
The Chase Field East Unit opened in 1994. It was later renamed Garza East Unit. The facility was named after Raul "Rudy" Garza, Sr., a city council member of Beeville and a longtime employee of the Chase Field Industrial Complex.

== See also ==
- McConnell Unit - State prison near Beeville
