= Garza West Unit =

Correctional transfer unit in Texas, US

Coordinates: 28°22′40″N 97°40′01″W

Garza West Unit is a correctional transfer unit on the grounds of Chase Field Industrial Complex in unincorporated Bee County, Texas, near the city of Beeville. It is co-located with the Garza East Unit.

The facility is operated by the Correctional Institutions Division of the Texas Department of Criminal Justice, administered as within Region IV.

The facility is classified as a Transfer Facility that houses adult male inmates convicted of felonies and state jail felonies. The inmates are housed temporarily after their transfer from county jails and are held no longer than two years, as per Texas Department of Criminal Justice policy.

== History ==
The Chase Field West Unit opened in 1994. It later received its current name. The facility and Garza West were named after Beeville city council member Raul "Rudy" Garza, Sr., who worked at the Chase Field Industrial Complex for many years.

== See also ==
- McConnell Unit - State prison near Beeville
