= Texas State Highway 72 =

State highway in Texas, United States

State Highway 72

Route information
- Maintained by TxDOT
- Length: 111.733 mi (Note: The certified length given is shorter than the actual mileage, as TxDOT does not include the concurrencies with SH 16 and US 281.) (179.817 km)
- Existed: 1923–present

Major junctions
- West end: SH 97 near Fowlerton
- US 281 in Three Rivers; I-37 near Three Rivers; US 181 in Kenedy; US 87 near Cuero
- East end: US 77 Alt. / US 87 / US 183 in Cuero

Location
- Country: United States
- State: Texas
- Counties: McMullen, Live Oak, Bee, Karnes, DeWitt

Highway system
- Highways in Texas; Interstate; US; State; Former; Toll; Loops; Spurs; FM/RM; Park; Rec
← SH 71	→ SH 73
← FM 62	FM 63	→ FM 64
← FM 3401	FM 3402	→ FM 3403

State Highway 72 (SH 72) is a Texas state highway that runs approximately 111 miles (179 km) from near Fowlerton to Cuero in South Texas.

== Route description ==
SH 72 begins in far western McMullen County, near the La Salle County line, at an intersection with SH 97 north of Fowlerton. The highway has no major intersections until it intersects SH 16 north of Tilden. The two routes run concurrently into Tilden, where SH 72 resumes its eastward path, passing south of Choke Canyon Reservoir and State Park before entering Live Oak County. The highway enters Three Rivers, where it intersects and runs concurrently with US 281 through the city center. After separating from US 281, SH 72 takes a more northeasterly trajectory for the remainder of its journey. After crossing I-37 at the freeway's exit #69, it continues through rural Live Oak County and briefly passes through Bee County before entering Karnes County. In Kenedy, SH 72 intersects US 181 and passes through the city's downtown along Main Street; SH 72's only business route is also in this city. To the east of the city, SH 72 intersects SH 239 and passes through Runge before entering DeWitt County. The highway passes through Yorktown along that city's Main Street, intersecting SH 119. SH 72 intersects US 87 to the west of Cuero before it turns to the east and into the city. SH 72 ends at US 77 Alt. / US 87 / US 183 on the south side of Cuero.

== History ==
SH 72 was originally proposed on August 21, 1923 from Cuero to Carmine, absorbing previously designated SH 3B. On March 17, 1924, it was extended southwest to Yorktown. On December 21, 1926, it was extended to Karnes City. On February 21, 1928, its south end was rerouted to Kenedy. On March 3, 1931, SH 72 Spur to Sweet Home was added, but was not part of the state highway system (it was added to the state highway system on March 16, 1937). On May 15, 1934, SH 72 Bypass was designated in Yoakum. On November 24, 1936, its route had been readjusted, with the section north of Cuero transferred to US 77/SH 44 and SH 128. On November 16, 1937, it was extended to Three Rivers. On September 26, 1939, it was extended west to Cotulla, replacing part of SH 202, and everything north of Cuero was cancelled (as it was part of US 77). SH 72 Spur and SH 72 Bypass were renumbered Spur 27 (Sweet Home) and Loop 51 (Yoakum). On June 23, 1942, the section from Fowlerton to Three Rivers was either cancelled or transferred to Farm to Market Road 63. On July 31, 1942, the section from Fowlerton to Cotulla was transferred to SH 97. On December 15, 1960, the section from Fowlerton to Three Rivers was transferred back to SH 72, replacing FM 63. On March 2, 1981, the section between Three Rivers and Tilden was relocated around the then-proposed Choke Canyon Reservoir, as the old route would be inundated by the Choke Canyon Reservoir. The section from the junction with US 87 in Cuero into the city was designated Farm to Market Road 3402 in 1977; this route was extended to the west to US 87 in 1983. FM 3402 was combined with SH 72 on March 31, 1994, completing the current route.

SH 72 has seen increased traffic due to oil and gas exploration of the Eagle Ford Formation; recent counts have indicated that traffic on SH 72 exceeds that on US 87 around Cuero. As a result, TxDOT is considering the addition of shoulders to SH 72 in western DeWitt County.

== Major intersections ==
County	Location	mi	km	Destinations	Notes
McMullen		0.0	0.0	SH 97 – Cotulla, Charlotte	Western terminus
McMullen		15.6	25.1	SH 16 north – Jourdanton	West end of SH 16 concurrency
McMullen	Tilden	16.3	26.2	SH 16 south – Freer	East end of SH 16 concurrency
McMullen		23.0	37.0	FM 99 – Whitsett	
McMullen		24.2	38.9	RE 7 east – Choke Canyon Reservoir	Western terminus of RE 7
McMullen		28.1	45.2	RE 8 north – Choke Canyon State Park	Southern terminus of RE 8
Live Oak		32.1	51.7	FM 1545 east – Simmons City	Western terminus of FM 1545
Live Oak		36.1	58.1	FM 1545 west	Eastern terminus of FM 1545
Live Oak	Three Rivers	39.1	62.9	US 281 north (Harborth Avenue)	West end of US 281 concurrency
Live Oak	Three Rivers	39.8	64.1	US 281 south (Harborth Avenue) – San Antonio	East end of US 281 concurrency
Live Oak		42.3	68.1	I-37 – Corpus Christi, San Antonio	I-37 exit 69
Live Oak		44.5	71.6	FM 1358 south	Northern terminus of FM 1358
Live Oak		46.9	75.5	FM 2049 north	Southern terminus of FM 2049
Bee	Pawnee	56.8	91.4	FM 798 east	Western terminus of FM 798
Bee	Pawnee	57.1	91.9	FM 673 south – Mineral	Northern terminus of FM 673
Bee		57.8	93.0	FM 882 west	Eastern terminus of FM 882
Karnes		60.5	97.4	FM 626 north	Southern terminus of FM 626
Karnes		64.0	103.0	FM 2985 south	Northern terminus of FM 2985
Karnes		70.6	113.6	FM 1145 east	Western terminus of FM 1145
Karnes	Kenedy	71.2	114.6	FM 2102 west	Eastern terminus of FM 2102
Karnes	Kenedy	71.6	115.2	US 181 / SH 239 begins – Beeville, Karnes City	West end of SH 239 concurrency
Karnes	Kenedy	72.0	115.9	Bus. US 181 north (5th Street)	West end of Bus. US 181 concurrency
Karnes	Kenedy	72.3	116.4	Bus. US 181 south (2nd Street)	East end of Bus. US 181 concurrency
Karnes	Kenedy	72.4	116.5	FM 792 north	Southern terminus of FM 792
Karnes	Kenedy	73.3	118.0	Bus. SH 72 south (Truck Route)	Northeastern terminus of Bus. SH 72
Karnes		74.2	119.4	SH 239 east – Goliad	East end of SH 239 concurrency
Karnes	Runge	82.6	132.9	FM 81 – Helena, Charco	
DeWitt	Nordheim	89.6	144.2	FM 239	
DeWitt		94.7	152.4	FM 952 – Cotton Patch	
DeWitt		96.1	154.7	FM 2980	
DeWitt	Yorktown	97.1	156.3	SH 119 – Goliad, Stockdale	
DeWitt	Yorktown	97.5	156.9	FM 240	
DeWitt		98.6	158.7	FM 237	
DeWitt		109.0	175.4	US 87 – Westhoff	
DeWitt	Cuero	112.9	181.7	US 77 Alt. / US 87 / US 183 (South Esplanade Street)	Eastern terminus
1.000 mi = 1.609 km; 1.000 km = 0.621 mi

== Business route ==
Business State Highway 72
- Location: Kenedy
- Length: 1.096 mi (1.764 km)
- Existed: 1982 (as Spur 542)–present

SH 72 has one business route, Business SH 72-B in Kenedy, which is a former alignment of the state highway along Karnes Street through that city. The route was designated as Spur 542 on April 20, 1982, when SH 72 was rerouted to use Main Street. The route was changed to Business SH 72-B on June 21, 1990. The western end of the business route is at Bus. US 181, which was renumbered from Spur 259 the same day.

Junction list

The entire route is in Kenedy, Karnes County.

mi	km	Destinations	Notes
0.0	0.0	Bus. US 181	Southwestern terminus
0.2	0.32	FM 743 north	Southern terminus of FM 743
1.1	1.8	SH 72 / SH 239	Northeastern terminus
1.000 mi = 1.609 km; 1.000 km = 0.621 mi

== See also ==
- List of state highways in Texas
