= McConnell Unit =

Texas state prison in unincorporated Bee County

Coordinates: 28.3723°N 97.7170°W

William G. McConnell Unit (ML) is a Texas state prison located in unincorporated Bee County, Texas, along Texas State Highway 181, 1 mile (1.6 km) east of the city limits of Beeville. It is a part of the Texas Department of Criminal Justice (TDCJ).

The unit, in proximity to Corpus Christi, was named after William G. "Bill" McConnell, the former chief of police of Beeville; he died in 1987.

== History ==
On October 10, 1993, Rogelio Cannady, 21, beat his cellmate, Leovigildo Bonal, 55, to death. Cannady was serving life behind bars for murdering two teenagers in 1990. Cannady beat Bonal with a steel lock attached to a belt and then kicked and stomped him repeatedly. Bonal died two days later. Cannady became the first charged under a 1993 law that allows offenders serving 99 years or life for previous murders to be charged with a capital offense. He was convicted in 1997 and sentenced to death. Cannady was executed on May 19, 2010.

On December 17, 1999, Correctional Officer Daniel Nagle was fatally stabbed at his office in McConnell. He received seven stab wounds and died of a heart attack. It was the first murder of a prison guard in Texas state prisons committed by a prisoner since 1985. The State of Texas accused prisoner Robert Lynn Pruett (TDCJ death row ID #999411) of committing the crime. He received a death sentence and was moved to the Polunsky Unit. Pruett stated that he did not kill Nagle. Pruett was executed on October 12, 2017

As of 2001, the unit's warden was Leslie W. Woods. That year, it had 2,806 prisoners. Many of the prisoners were Hispanic and Latino, since the prison is in the South Texas region. As of 2001, the prison had 570 prison guards and 273 other employees.

In May 2003, Darrel Wafer, a 40-year-old prisoner, was left in a hot shower. Because guards and a nurse did not remove him in time, Wafer died of hyperthermia.

On August 1, 2004, prisoner Micah "Mike" Burrell died of an asthma attack. According to Texas Civil Rights Project attorney Scott Medlock, the prison guards decided not to assist him, and 15 other people (by 2007) had died due to negligence issues. Eileen Kennedy, the assistant warden of McConnell at the time, stated that she was unaware that a policy stating that an asthmatic should not be housed alone existed.

In 2013, in federal court, 14 prison guards at McConnell and 11 other individuals pleaded guilty to operating a smuggling ring in the prison. The individuals convicted of violating the Racketeer Influenced and Corrupt Organizations Act got federal prison terms. Others got prison and/or probation time.

== Operations ==
According to Major Brian Rodeen, as of 2001, many of the prisoners at McConnell have life sentences and most have sentences over 45 years. Joseph T. Hallinan, author of Going Up the River: Travels in a Prison Nation, wrote, "The convicts at the McConnell Unit are among the most hardened in the Texas prison system."

As of 2001, the "administrative segregation" area, with 504 cells, had 504 prisoners segregated by race to prevent gang violence. The cells, divided into pods labeled by letters of the alphabet, included members of the Mexican Mafia. According to prison guards quoted in Going Up the River, the A pod includes gang leaders who do not wish to disturb the situation around them and therefore is quieter, while the F pod has lower-ranking members, so is more tense. Rodeen referred to the McConnell administrative segregation section as being among the most dangerous in Texas.

== Notable prisoners ==
Current:

- David Malcolm Strickland
- Thomas Bartlett Whitaker
- Yaser Abdel Said

Former:

- Trey Eric Sesler

== See also ==
- Garza East Unit
- Garza West Unit
