= Bee County Courthouse =

- U.S. National Register of Historic Places
- Texas State Antiquities Landmark
- Recorded Texas Historic Landmark
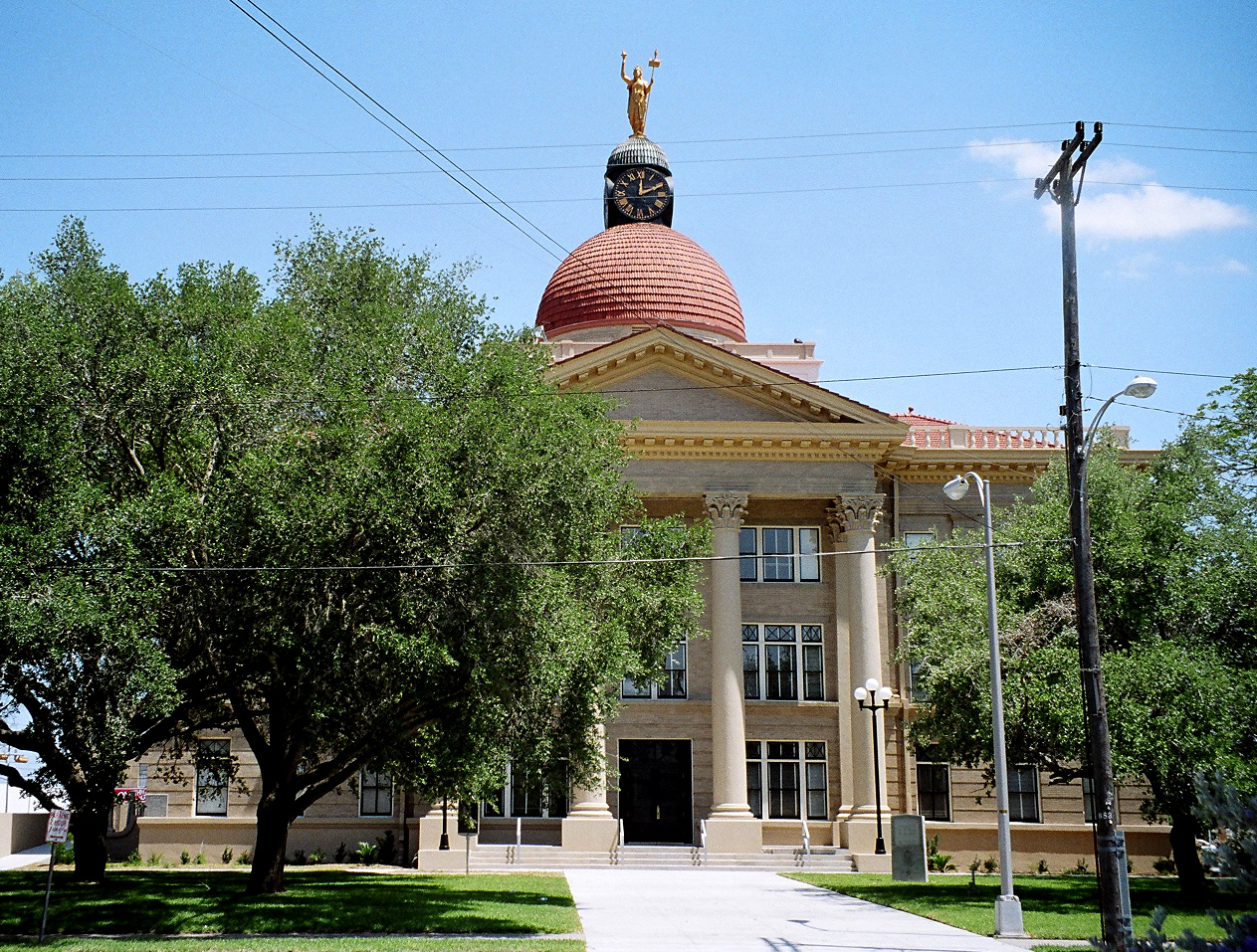
- Bee County Courthouse in 2006

- Location within Texas Location within the United States
- Interactive map showing the location for Bee County Courthouse
- Location: 105 W. Corpus Christi St., Beeville, Texas
- Coordinates: 28°24′04″N 97°44′53″W
- Area: 4 acres (1.6 ha)
- Built: 1912
- Built by: W.C. Whitney
- Architect: William C. Stephenson, Fritz W. Heldenfels
- Architectural style: Beaux Arts
- NRHP reference No.: 01000105
- TSAL No.: 8200001176
- RTHL No.: 12317

Significant dates
- Added to NRHP: February 9, 2001
- Designated TSAL: January 1, 2002
- Designated RTHL: 2000

The Bee County Courthouse, at 105 W. Corpus Christi St. in Beeville, Texas, United States, was built in 1912. It was listed on the National Register of Historic Places in 2001.

It was designed by architect William C. Stephenson in Beaux Arts style.

Besides the courthouse, the listing included a contributing structure and a contributing object.

== See also ==
- National Register of Historic Places listings in Bee County, Texas
- Recorded Texas Historic Landmarks in Bee County
- List of county courthouses in Texas

== Bibliography ==
- Kelsey, Mavis P, Sr.; Dyal, Donald H. (1993). The Courthouses of Texas. College Station, TX: Texas A&M University Press. ISBN 0-89096-546-3.
