= Pettus, Texas =

Census-designated place in Bee County, Texas, United States

- Census-designated place
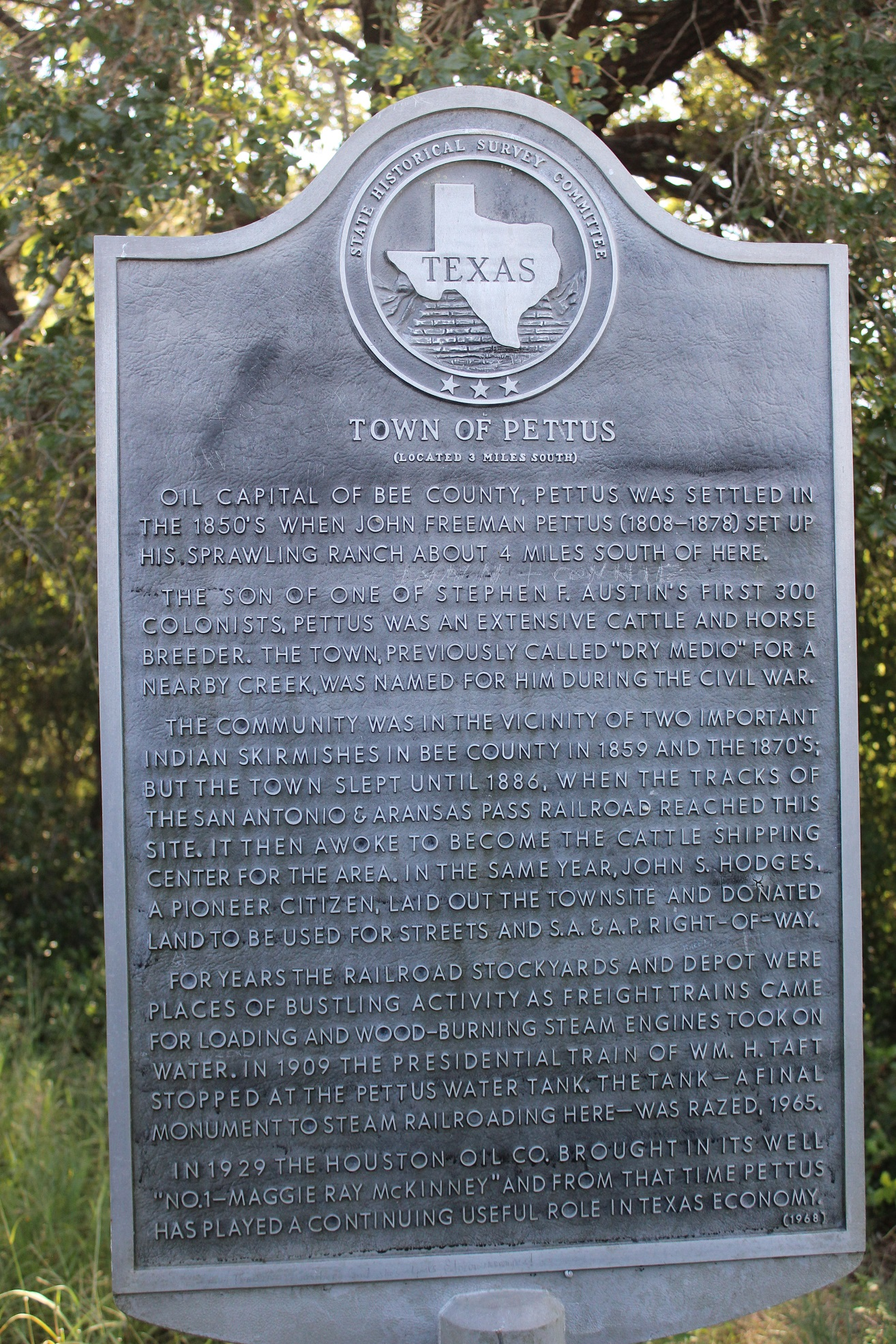

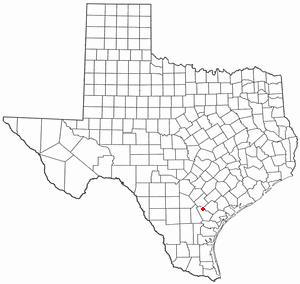
- Location of Pettus, Texas

- Coordinates: 28°37′5″N 97°48′8″W
- Country: United States
- State: Texas
- County: Bee

Area
  - Total: 5.8 sq mi (15.1 km^{2})
  - Land: 5.8 sq mi (15.1 km^{2})
  - Water: 0 sq mi (0.0 km^{2})
- Elevation: 299 ft (91 m)

Population (2020)
  - Total: 449
  - Density: 77.0/sq mi (29.7/km^{2})
- Time zone: UTC-6 (Central (CST))
  - Summer (DST): UTC-5 (CDT)
- ZIP code: 78146
- Area code: 361
- FIPS code: 48-57116
- GNIS feature ID: 1365119

Pettus is a census-designated place (CDP) in Bee County, Texas, United States. The population was 449 at the 2020 census.

== Geography ==
Pettus is located in northern Bee County at 28°37′5″N 97°48′8″W (28.6180446, -97.8022219). U.S. Route 181 passes through the community, leading southward 16 miles (26 km) to Beeville, the county seat, and northward 14 miles (23 km) to Kenedy.

According to the United States Census Bureau, the CDP has a total area of 5.8 square miles (15.1 km^{2}), all land.

== Demographics ==
Historical population
Census	Pop.	Note	%±
2000	608		—
2010	558		−8.2%
2020	449		−19.5%
U.S. Decennial Census; 1850–1900 1910; 1920 1930 1940; 1950 1960 1970; 1980 1990 2000; 2010 2020

Pettus was first listed as a census designated place in the 2000 U.S. census.

=== 2000 census ===
Pettus CDP, Texas – Racial and ethnic composition Note: the US Census treats Hispanic/Latino as an ethnic category. This table excludes Latinos from the racial categories and assigns them to a separate category. Hispanics/Latinos may be of any race.
Race / Ethnicity (NH = Non-Hispanic)	Pop 2000	Pop 2010	Pop 2020	% 2000	% 2010	% 2020
White alone (NH)	275	253	183	45.23%	45.34%	40.76%
Black or African American alone (NH)	0	3	0	0.00%	0.54%	0.00%
Native American or Alaska Native alone (NH)	0	7	0	0.00%	1.25%	0.00%
Asian alone (NH)	0	0	0	0.00%	0.00%	0.00%
Pacific Islander alone (NH)	0	0	0	0.00%	0.00%	0.00%
Other race alone (NH)	0	0	1	0.00%	0.00%	0.22%
Mixed race or Multiracial (NH)	4	7	13	0.66%	1.25%	2.90%
Hispanic or Latino (any race)	329	288	252	54.11%	51.61%	56.12%
Total	608	558	449	100.00%	100.00%	100.00%

As of the census of 2000, there were 608 people, 223 households, and 169 families residing in the CDP. The population density was 104.8 inhabitants per square mile (40.5/km^{2}). There were 257 housing units at an average density of 44.3 per square mile (17.1/km^{2}). The racial makeup of the CDP was 71.88% White, 0.49% Native American, 24.67% from other races, and 2.96% from two or more races. Hispanic or Latino of any race were 54.11% of the population.

There were 223 households, out of which 35.9% had children under the age of 18 living with them, 56.5% were married couples living together, 14.8% had a female householder with no husband present, and 24.2% were non-families. 22.0% of all households were made up of individuals, and 10.8% had someone living alone who was 65 years of age or older. The average household size was 2.73 and the average family size was 3.17.

In the CDP, the population was spread out, with 29.3% under the age of 18, 7.4% from 18 to 24, 22.0% from 25 to 44, 26.8% from 45 to 64, and 14.5% who were 65 years of age or older. The median age was 37 years. For every 100 females, there were 99.3 males. For every 100 females age 18 and over, there were 90.3 males.

The median income for a household in the CDP was $28,500, and the median income for a family was $35,469. Males had a median income of $23,750 versus $19,464 for females. The per capita income for the CDP was $12,486. About 11.8% of families and 16.0% of the population were below the poverty line, including 21.2% of those under age 18 and 8.2% of those age 65 or over.

== Education ==
Pettus is served by the Pettus Independent School District and home to the Pettus Secondary School Eagles.

== See also ==
- List of census-designated places in Texas
