= Pawnee, Texas =

- Census-designated place
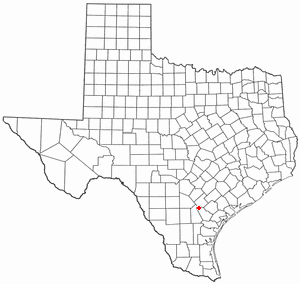
- Location of Pawnee, Texas

- Coordinates: 28°38′58″N 98°0′6″W
- Country: United States
- State: Texas
- County: Bee

Area
  - Total: 5.3 sq mi (13.6 km^{2})
  - Land: 5.3 sq mi (13.6 km^{2})
  - Water: 0 sq mi (0.0 km^{2})
- Elevation: 384 ft (117 m)

Population (2020)
  - Total: 140
  - Density: 27/sq mi (10/km^{2})
- Time zone: UTC-6 (Central (CST))
  - Summer (DST): UTC-5 (CDT)
- ZIP code: 78145
- Area code: 361
- FIPS code: 48-56252
- GNIS feature ID: 1364905

Pawnee is a census-designated place (CDP) in Bee County, Texas, United States. Its population was 140 at the 2020 census.

== Geography ==
Pawnee is located in northwestern Bee County at 28°38′58″N 98°0′6″W (28.649307, -98.001649). Texas State Highway 72 runs through the community, leading northeastward 15 miles (24 km) to Kenedy and southwestward 14 miles (23 km) to Interstate 37, near Three Rivers.

According to the United States Census Bureau, the CDP has a total area of 5.3 square miles (13.6 km^{2}), all land.

== Attractions ==
Pawnee is known for its excellent dove, quail, and whitetail deer hunting.

== Demographics ==
Historical population
Census	Pop.	Note	%±
2000	201		—
2010	166		−17.4%
2020	140		−15.7%
U.S. Decennial Census; 1850–1900 1910; 1920 1930 1940; 1950 1960 1970; 1980 1990 2000; 2010 2020

Pawnee was first listed as a CDP in the 2000 U.S. census.

Pawnee CDP, Texas – Racial and ethnic composition Note: the US Census treats Hispanic/Latino as an ethnic category. This table excludes Latinos from the racial categories and assigns them to a separate category. Hispanics/Latinos may be of any race.
Race / Ethnicity (NH = Non-Hispanic)	Pop 2000	Pop 2010	Pop 2020	% 2000	% 2010	% 2020
White alone (NH)	19	37	25	9.45%	22.29%	17.86%
Black or African American alone (NH)	1	0	0	0.50%	0.00%	0.00%
Native American or Alaska Native alone (NH)	0	0	0	0.00%	0.00%	0.00%
Asian alone (NH)	0	0	2	0.00%	0.00%	1.43%
Pacific Islander alone (NH)	0	0	0	0.00%	0.00%	0.00%
Other race alone (NH)	0	0	0	0.00%	0.00%	0.00%
Multiracial (NH)	0	2	2	0.00%	1.20%	1.43%
Hispanic or Latino (any race)	181	127	111	90.05%	76.51%	79.29%
Total	201	166	140	100.00%	100.00%	100.00%

=== 2000 census ===
As of the 2000 census, 201 people, 75 households, and 54 families were residing in the CDP. The population density was 38.5 people per square mile (14.9 people/km^{2}). The 93 housing units had an average density of 17.8 per square mile (6.9/km^{2}). The racial makeup of the CDP was 58.21% White, 0.50% African American, 41.29% from other races. Hispanics or Latinos of any race were 90.05% of the population.

Of the 75 households, 29.3% had children under 18 living with them, 66.7% were married couples living together, 1.3% had a female householder with no husband present, and 28.0% were not families; 24.0% of all households were made up of individuals, and 16.0% had someone living alone who was 65 or older. The average household size was 2.68, and the average family size was 3.28.

In the CDP, the age distribution was 23.9% under 18, 8.5% from 18 to 24, 26.9% from 25 to 44, 21.9% from 45 to 64, and 18.9% who were 65 or older. The median age was 38 years. For every 100 females, there were 109.4 males. For every 100 females 18 and over, there were 109.6 males.

The median income in the CDP for a household was $35,500 and for a family was $57,000. Males had a median income of $46,042 versus $37,125 for females. The per capita income for the CDP was $21,165. About 17.0% of families and 19.9% of the population were below the poverty line, including 26.7% of those under18 and 35.8% of those 65 or over.

== Education ==
Pawnee is served by the Pawnee Independent School District for prekindergarten through grade 8.

== Area information ==
The small town consists of one convenience store, a US post office, the school district, a mechanic service, a natural gas plant, a cabinet maker, a volunteer fire department, an excavation company, a community center, and several churches.

The Pawnee area has gradually been increasing in the exploration and production of natural gas. Just driving around the community and ranches, one can see wells and new rigs going up.

Pawnee has more recently welcomed Almega Cable and Ranch Wireless to the community. Ranch Wireless provides wireless internet and Almega Cable provides cable internet to the citizens of Pawnee. Almega has also established a computer center, the Pawnee Community Connect Center, for the community to access the internet free of cost.

== Religion ==
The small community boasts five churches: Catholic, Methodist, Baptist, Iglesia Bautista y Manuela, and Church of Christ.
