= Beeville Independent School District =

School district in Texas, United States

Location
- Beeville, Texas ESC Region 2 USA
- Coordinates: 28°24′10″N 97°44′55″W

District information
- Type: Public Independent school district
- Grades: EE through 12
- Superintendent: Dr. Travis Fanning
- Schools: 7
- NCES District ID: 4809720

Students and staff
- Students: 3,344 (2018-19)
- Teachers: 221 (2018-19)
- Student–teacher ratio: 16.5 (2018-19)
- Athletic conference: UIL Class 4A Football Division I
- District mascot: Trojans
- Colors: Orange, White

Other information
- TEA District Accountability Rating for 2014: Met Standard
- Website: www.beevilleisd.net

Beeville Independent School District is a public school district based in Beeville, Texas (USA). Beeville serves central Bee County, including the city of Beeville and the unincorporated community of Blue Berry Hill.

== Finances ==
As of the 2018–2019 school year, the appraised valuation of property in the district was $744,700,000. The maintenance tax rate was $1.17 and the bond tax rate was $0.0354 per $100 of appraised valuation.

== Academic achievement ==
In 2017, the school district was rated "Met Standard" by the Texas Education Agency.

== Schools ==
In the 2018–2019 school year, the district has seven schools open.

- A. C. Jones High School (Grades 9-12)
- Health Professions Magnet Academy (Grades 9-12)
- Moreno Junior High School (Grades 6-8)
- The Joe Barnhart Magnet Academy- A program in Moreno Junior High School (Grades 6-8)
- Fadden–McKeown–Chambliss Elementary School (Grades 1-5)
- R. A. Hall Elementary School (Grades 1-5)
- Hampton–Moreno–Dugat Early Childhood Center (EE-KG)

== See also ==
- List of school districts in Texas
