= Bee County, Texas =

County in Texas, United States

- County
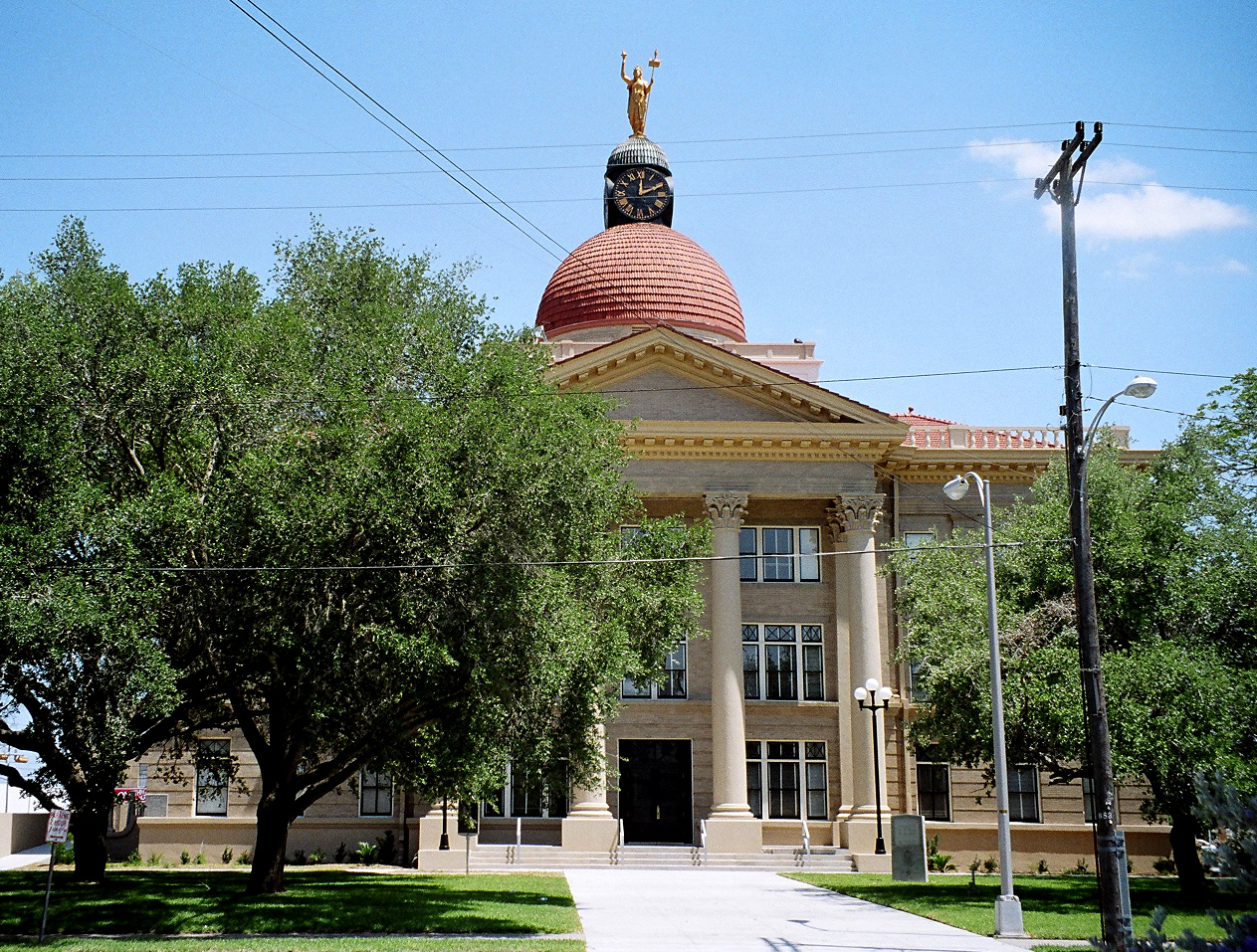
- The Bee County Courthouse in Beeville was built in 1913.

- Location within the U.S. state of Texas
- Coordinates: 28°25′N 97°44′W
- Country: United States
- State: Texas
- Founded: 1858
- Named for: Barnard E. Bee, Sr.
- Seat: Beeville
- Largest city: Beeville

Area
  - Total: 880 sq mi (2,300 km^{2})
  - Land: 880 sq mi (2,300 km^{2})
  - Water: 0.1 sq mi (0.26 km^{2}) 0.01%

Population (2020)
  - Total: 31,047
  - Estimate (2025): 32,515 ▲
  - Density: 35.3/sq mi (13.6/km^{2})
- Time zone: UTC−6 (Central)
  - Summer (DST): UTC−5 (CDT)
- Congressional district: 27th
- Website: beecounty.gov

Bee County is a county located in the U.S. state of Texas. It is in South Texas and its county seat is Beeville. As of the 2020 census, its population was 31,047. The Beeville, TX micropolitan statistical area includes all of Bee County. The county was founded December 8, 1857, and organized the next year. It is named for Barnard E. Bee, Sr., a secretary of state of the Republic of Texas.

== History ==
On December 8, 1857, the Texas Legislature formed Bee County from sections of Refugio, Live Oak, San Patricio, Goliad, and Karnes Counties, naming it for Colonel Barnard Elliot Bee, who served the Republic of Texas as Sam Houston's secretary of war and Mirabeau B. Lamar's secretary of state.

During the Anglo-American land speculation of the 1830s, the area's earliest settlers were mainly Irish immigrants, but by the late 1840s and early 1850s, the rise of Jacksonian expansionism inspired Southern whites from the North Carolina, South Carolina, Louisiana, and Mississippi to occupy and build settlements in the area.

As the constitution of the Republic of Texas no longer recognized the Catholic Church (or any church) as the state religion and slave-holding settlers came to dominate the area in the 1840s, small Methodist, Presbyterian, and Baptist congregations began forming with sustained missionary support from these denominations. Research suggests that Baptists and Methodists comprised 65% of all Texas congregations by 1870.

== Geography ==
According to the U.S. Census Bureau, the county has a total area of 880 square miles (2,300 km^{2}), of which 0.1 square miles (0.26 km^{2}) (0.01%) is covered by water. The Aransas River forms in Bee County, southwest of Beeville and north of Skidmore.

=== Major highways ===
- U.S. Highway 59
  - Interstate 69W is currently under construction and will follow the current route of U.S. 59 in most places.
- U.S. Highway 181
- State Highway 72
- State Highway 202
- State Highway 359
- Farm to Market Road 673
- Farm to Market Road 799
- Farm to Market Road 888

=== Adjacent counties ===
- Karnes County (north)
- Goliad County (northeast)
- Refugio County (east)
- San Patricio County (southeast)
- Live Oak County (west)

== Demographics ==
Historical population
Census	Pop.	Note	%±
1860	910		—
1870	1,082		18.9%
1880	2,298		112.4%
1890	3,720		61.9%
1900	7,720		107.5%
1910	12,090		56.6%
1920	12,137		0.4%
1930	15,721		29.5%
1940	16,481		4.8%
1950	18,174		10.3%
1960	23,755		30.7%
1970	22,737		−4.3%
1980	26,030		14.5%
1990	25,135		−3.4%
2000	32,359		28.7%
2010	31,861		−1.5%
2020	31,047		−2.6%
2025 (est.)	32,515	▲	4.7%
U.S. Decennial Census; 1850–2010 2010–2020

=== Racial and ethnic composition ===
Bee County, Texas – Racial and ethnic composition Note: the US Census treats Hispanic/Latino as an ethnic category. This table excludes Latinos from the racial categories and assigns them to a separate category. Hispanics/Latinos may be of any race.
Race / Ethnicity (NH = Non-Hispanic)	Pop 1980	Pop 1990	Pop 2000	Pop 2010	Pop 2020	% 1980	% 1990	% 2000	% 2010	% 2020
White alone (NH)	13,046	11,211	11,352	10,967	8,600	50.12%	44.60%	35.08%	34.42%	27.70%
Black or African American alone (NH)	656	690	3,145	2,525	2,316	2.52%	2.75%	9.72%	7.93%	7.46%
Native American or Alaska Native alone (NH)	91	61	62	70	54	0.35%	0.24%	0.19%	0.22%	0.17%
Asian alone (NH)	280	200	148	162	211	1.08%	0.80%	0.46%	0.51%	0.68%
Native Hawaiian or Pacific Islander alone (NH)	x	x	8	10	2	x	x	0.02%	0.03%	0.01%
Other race alone (NH)	43	64	9	38	65	0.17%	0.25%	0.03%	0.12%	0.21%
Mixed race or Multiracial (NH)	x	x	185	183	407	x	x	0.57%	0.57%	1.31%
Hispanic or Latino (any race)	11,914	12,909	17,450	17,906	19,392	45.77%	51.36%	53.93%	56.20%	62.46%
Total	26,030	25,135	32,359	31,861	31,047	100.00%	100.00%	100.00%	100.00%	100.00%

=== 2020 census ===
As of the 2020 census, 31,047 people, 8,896 households, and 5,693 families resided in the county. The median age was 37.8 years; 19.4% of residents were under the age of 18 and 13.5% were 65 years of age or older. For every 100 females there were 155.7 males, and for every 100 females age 18 and over there were 172.8 males age 18 and over.

The racial makeup of the county was 49.4% White, 7.7% Black or African American, 0.7% American Indian and Alaska Native, 0.7% Asian, <0.1% Native Hawaiian and Pacific Islander, 23.1% from some other race, and 18.4% from two or more races. Hispanic or Latino residents of any race comprised 62.5% of the population.

45.8% of residents lived in urban areas, while 54.2% lived in rural areas.

There were 8,896 households in the county, of which 33.8% had children under the age of 18 living in them. Of all households, 44.5% were married-couple households, 19.3% were households with a male householder and no spouse or partner present, and 29.1% were households with a female householder and no spouse or partner present. About 25.5% of all households were made up of individuals and 11.4% had someone living alone who was 65 years of age or older.

There were 10,562 housing units, of which 15.8% were vacant. Among occupied housing units, 64.4% were owner-occupied and 35.6% were renter-occupied. The homeowner vacancy rate was 3.0% and the rental vacancy rate was 14.5%.

=== 2010 census ===
As of the 2010 United States census, 31,861 people lived in the county; 78.8% were White, 8.1% Black or African American, 0.6% Asian, 0.5% Native American, 0.1% Pacific Islander, 9.7% of some other race, and 2.3% of two or more races. About 56.2% were Hispanics or Latinos (of any race).

=== 2000 census ===
As of the Census of 2000, 32,359 people, 9,061 households, and 6,578 families lived in the county. The population density was 37 people per square mile (14 people/km^{2}). The 10,939 housing units had an average density of 12 units per square mile (4.6/km^{2}). The racial makeup of the county was 67.85% White, 9.90% African American, 0.42% Native American, 0.51% Asian, 0.03% Pacific Islander, 19.15% from other races, and 2.13% from two or more races. About 53.93% of the population were Hispanics or Latinos of any race.

Of the 9,061 households, 37.8% had children under 18 living with them, 52.9% were married couples living together, 14.8% had a female householder with no husband present, and 27.4% were not families. About 23.7% of all households were made up of individuals, and 9.9% had someone living alone who was 65 or older. The average household size was 2.74, and the average family size was 3.25.

In the county, the population was distributed as 23.4% under 18, 13.3% from 18 to 24, 35.4% from 25 to 44, 17.8% from 45 to 64, and 10.2% who were 65 or older. The median age was 32 years. For every 100 females, there were 148.40 males. For every 100 females 18 and over, there were 164.90 males.

The median income for a household in the county was $28,392, and for a family was $32,967. Males had a median income of $26,473 versus $20,666 for females. The per capita income for the county was $10,625. About 19.70% of families and 24.00% of the population were below the poverty line, including 33.80% of those under age 18 and 18.30% of those age 65 or over.

== Government and infrastructure ==
The Texas Department of Criminal Justice operates the Correctional Institutions Division Region IV Office on the grounds of Chase Field Naval Air Station in unincorporated Bee County. In addition, Garza East Unit and Garza West Unit, transfer facilities, are co-located on the grounds of the naval air station, and the McConnell Unit is also in an unincorporated area in Bee County. The Beeville Distribution Center is on the grounds of the air station.

In 1981 the county government provided firefighting services in unincorporated areas, and there was a proposal to move that competency to four rural firefighting districts made largely on school district boundaries, each with taxing powers.

=== Politics ===
Bee County is somewhat moderate in comparison to surrounding counties in its support of Republicans in presidential elections. In 2016, Donald Trump won less than 56% of the vote. As recently as 1996, it gave a majority of its votes to the Democratic candidate.

United States presidential election results for Bee County, Texas
Year	Republican		Democratic		Third party(ies)	
Year	No.	%	No.	%	No.	%
1912	35	5.91%	476	80.41%	81	13.68%
1916	152	19.82%	584	76.14%	31	4.04%
1920	283	30.66%	545	59.05%	95	10.29%
1924	944	45.45%	987	47.52%	146	7.03%
1928	1,189	53.18%	1,043	46.65%	4	0.18%
1932	534	19.60%	2,180	80.03%	10	0.37%
1936	603	28.96%	1,462	70.22%	17	0.82%
1940	948	35.02%	1,759	64.98%	0	0.00%
1944	848	35.17%	1,306	54.17%	257	10.66%
1948	801	33.74%	1,441	60.70%	132	5.56%
1952	2,536	61.46%	1,583	38.37%	7	0.17%
1956	2,401	55.26%	1,929	44.40%	15	0.35%
1960	2,220	46.38%	2,557	53.42%	10	0.21%
1964	1,509	31.23%	3,314	68.58%	9	0.19%
1968	1,995	35.98%	2,957	53.34%	592	10.68%
1972	3,779	64.42%	2,067	35.24%	20	0.34%
1976	2,953	43.93%	3,690	54.89%	79	1.18%
1980	4,171	52.59%	3,606	45.47%	154	1.94%
1984	5,377	59.32%	3,659	40.37%	28	0.31%
1988	4,620	49.78%	4,616	49.74%	45	0.48%
1992	3,633	39.89%	4,083	44.83%	1,392	15.28%
1996	3,611	41.19%	4,561	52.03%	594	6.78%
2000	4,429	53.17%	3,795	45.56%	106	1.27%
2004	5,428	57.03%	4,045	42.50%	45	0.47%
2008	4,471	54.81%	3,645	44.69%	41	0.50%
2012	4,356	55.29%	3,452	43.81%	71	0.90%
2016	4,744	55.91%	3,444	40.59%	297	3.50%
2020	6,006	63.72%	3,288	34.88%	132	1.40%
2024	6,111	69.52%	2,606	29.65%	73	0.83%

United States Senate election results for Bee County, Texas1
Year	Republican		Democratic		Third party(ies)	
Year	No.	%	No.	%	No.	%
2024	5,639	65.03%	2,845	32.81%	188	2.17%

United States Senate election results for Bee County, Texas2
Year	Republican		Democratic		Third party(ies)	
Year	No.	%	No.	%	No.	%
2020	5,713	63.09%	3,103	34.27%	239	2.64%

Texas Gubernatorial election results for Bee County
Year	Republican		Democratic		Third party(ies)	
Year	No.	%	No.	%	No.	%
2022	4,347	67.84%	1,976	30.84%	85	1.33%

== Education ==
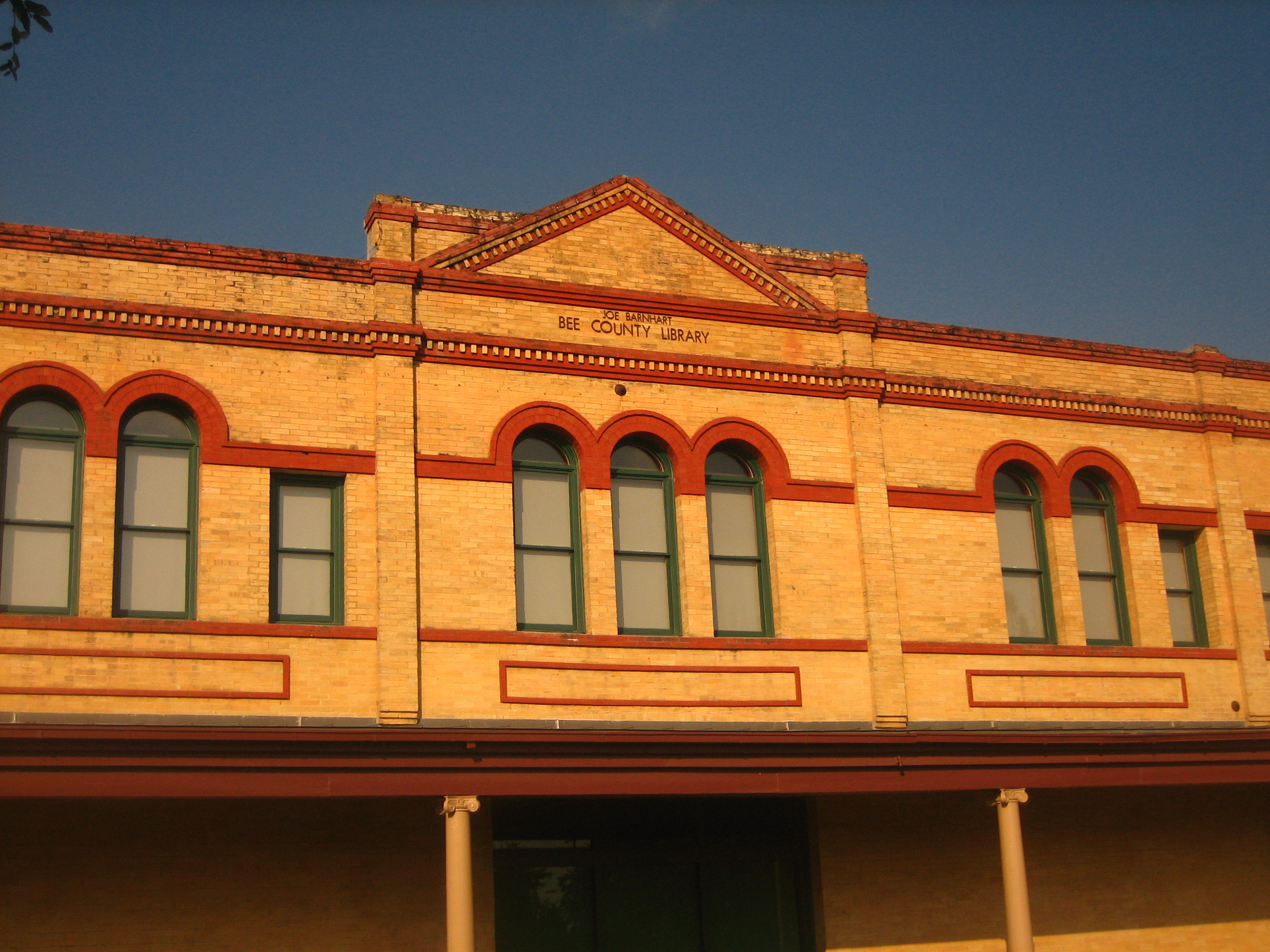
The Joe Barnhart Bee County Library is located in downtown Beeville across the street from the courthouse.

These school districts serve Bee County:

- Beeville Independent School District
- Mathis Independent School District (partial)
- Pawnee Independent School District (partial, K-8)
- Pettus Independent School District (partial)
- Refugio Independent School District (partial)
- Skidmore-Tynan Independent School District (partial)
- Three Rivers Independent School District (partial)

Coastal Bend College (formerly Bee County College), a postsecondary institution, serves Bee County among other counties and areas.

== Communities ==
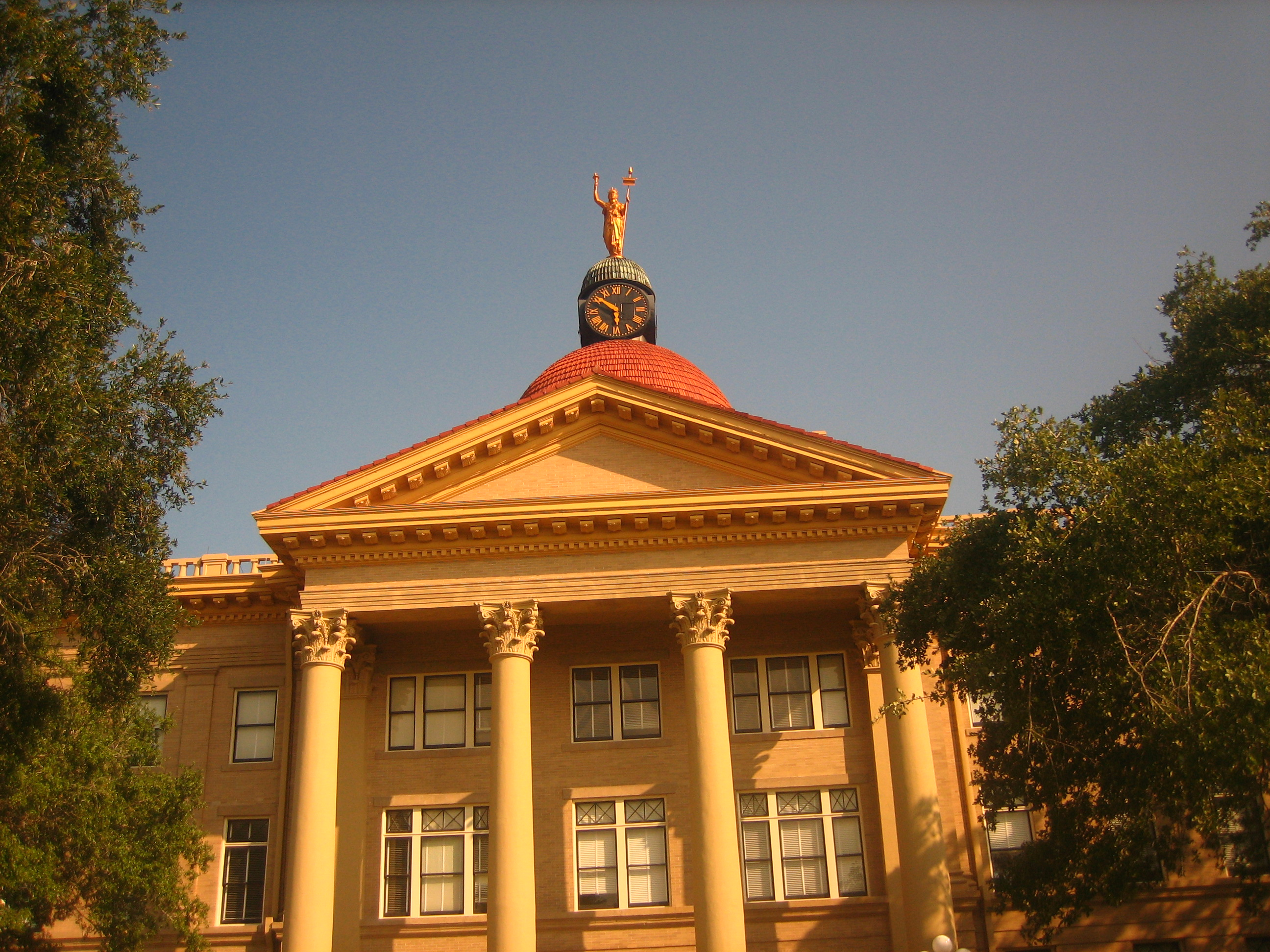
The Bee County Courthouse in Beeville was designed by architect W.C. Stephenson, formerly of Buffalo, New York

=== City ===
- Beeville (county seat)

=== Census-designated places ===
- Blue Berry Hill
- Normanna
- Pawnee
- Pettus
- Skidmore
- Tuleta
- Tulsita
- Tynan

=== Unincorporated communities ===
- Blanconia
- Cadiz
- Caesar
- Clareville
- Mineral
- Monteola
- Oaks
- Olmos
- Orangedale
- Papalote
- Yougeen

== See also ==
- List of museums in South Texas
- National Register of Historic Places listings in Bee County, Texas
- Recorded Texas Historic Landmarks in Bee County
