= Pawnee Independent School District =

School district in Texas, United States

Location
- Pawnee, Texas ESC Region 02 USA
- Coordinates: 28.6525°N 98.0043°W

District information
- Type: Public Independent school district
- Grades: EE through 8
- Superintendent: Michelle Hartmann
- Schools: 1 (2012-13)
- NCES District ID: 4834410

Students and staff
- Students: 156 (2012-13)
- Teachers: 11.96 (2012-13) (on full-time equivalent (FTE) basis)
- Student–teacher ratio: 13.04 (2012-13)

Other information
- Website: www.pawneeisd.net

Pawnee Independent School District is a public school district based in the community of Pawnee, Texas (USA) serves a small, rural student population of approximately 252 students (as of 2026) from Pre-K through 12th grade.

Located in Bee County, a small portion of the district extends into Karnes County.

Pawnee ISD has one school - Pawnee Elementary/Junior High - that serves students in EE through eight.

In 2009, the school district was rated "academically acceptable" by the Texas Education Agency.

== History ==
In 2022 the television station KRIS-TV (NBC 6) reported that allegations of retaliation had been made against the superintendent, Michelle Hartman.
