= Beeville, Texas =

City in and county seat of Bee County, Texas, United States

- City
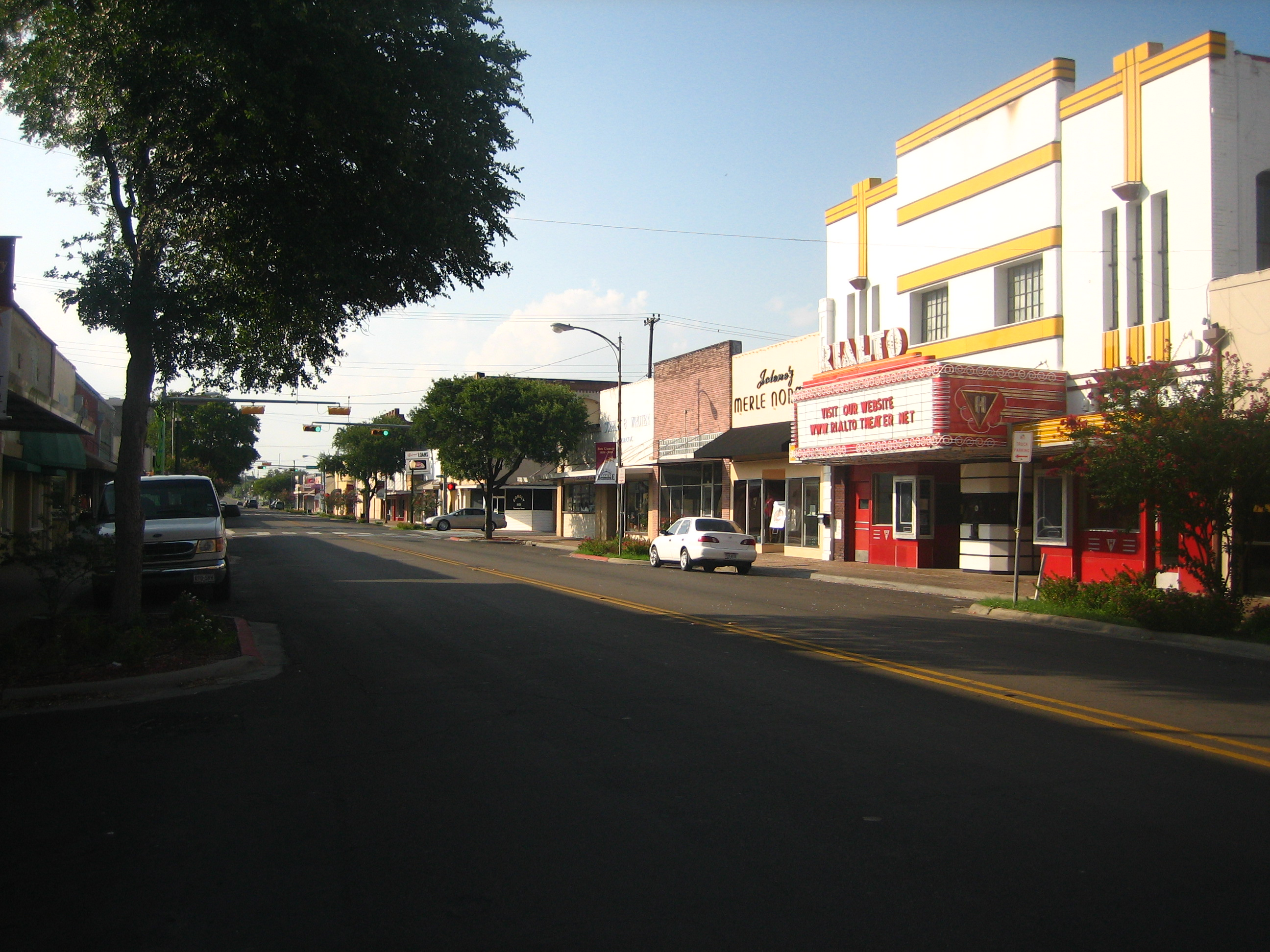
- Historic downtown Beeville showing the Rialto Theater
- Interactive map of Beeville, Texas
- Coordinates: 28°24′20″N 97°45′3″W
- Country: United States
- State: Texas
- County: Bee
- Settled: 1859
- Incorporated: 1890

Government
  - Mayor: Mike Willow
  - City Manager: Andy Joslin

Area
  - Total: 6.38 sq mi (16.52 km^{2})
  - Land: 6.38 sq mi (16.52 km^{2})
  - Water: 0 sq mi (0.00 km^{2})
- Elevation: 210 ft (64 m)

Population (2020)
  - Total: 13,669
  - Estimate (2021): 13,641
  - Density: 2,006.2/sq mi (774.58/km^{2})
  - Demonym: Beevillian
- Time zone: UTC-6 (Central (CST))
  - Summer (DST): UTC-5 (CDT)
- ZIP codes: 78102, 78104
- Area code: 361
- FIPS code: 48-07192
- GNIS feature ID: 1330346
- Website: https://www.beevilletx.gov/

Beeville is a city in Bee County, Texas, United States. Its population of 13,543 at the 2020 census makes it the 207th-largest city in Texas. It is the county seat of Bee County and home to the main campus of Coastal Bend College. The area around the city contains three prisons operated by the Texas Department of Criminal Justice.

Many of the stately homes, commercial buildings, and schools in the area, including the Bee County Courthouse, were designed by architect William Charles Stephenson, who came to Beeville in 1908 from Buffalo, New York. Beeville is a national Main Street city. Gutzon Borglum, the sculptor of Mount Rushmore, and his son Lincoln, lived in the city during the time Rushmore was being sculpted.

== History and culture ==
The original and official site on the Poesta River was first settled by the Burke, Carroll, and Heffernan families in the 1830s. Present-day Beeville was established on 150 acres (61 ha) of land donated by Ann Burke in May 1859, after the United States annexed the Republic of Texas. It was first named "Maryville" for pioneer Mary Heffernan. It was renamed Beeville after Barnard E. Bee, Sr., who had served as secretary of state and secretary of war for the Republic of Texas. It was called Beeville-on-the-Poesta, with another community, Beeville-on-the-Medio, 7 mi (11 km) to the west. The first post office opened in 1859.

In 1886, the first railroad was constructed through Beeville, stimulating the growth of the economy and population. The Southern Pacific Transportation Company operated these railroads until the early 1970s.

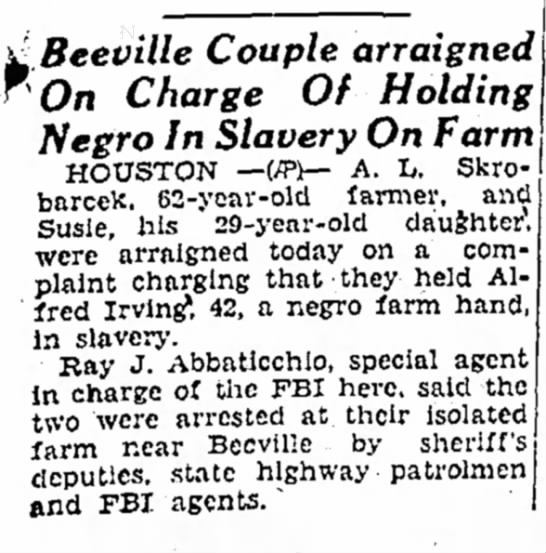
A contemporary newspaper article reporting on the Alfred Irving case (October 2, 1942 - The Brownsville Herald)

In September 1942, Alfred Irving, who is believed to be one of the final chattel slaves in the United States, was freed at a farm near Beeville. Alex L. Skrobarcek and his daughter, Susie, were indicted by a federal grand jury in Laredo, Texas on November 9, 1942. The pair were found guilty in federal court in Corpus Christi on March 18, 1943. Alex Skrobarcek was sentenced to four years in prison, and Susie Skrobarcek two years.

The United States Navy operated the Beeville Naval Air Station, which trained Navy airplane pilots during World War II from 1943 to 1946. The base reopened in 1952 as Naval Air Station Chase Field, continuing in operation until 1992.

Beeville was served by Trans-Texas Airways during the 1950s; it operated scheduled passenger flights with Douglas DC-3 propeller airliners from Chase Field to Brownsville, Corpus Christi, Harlingen, Houston, San Antonio, and other destinations in Texas.

In 1967, the town was inundated by 30 inches (760 mm) of rain during Hurricane Beulah.

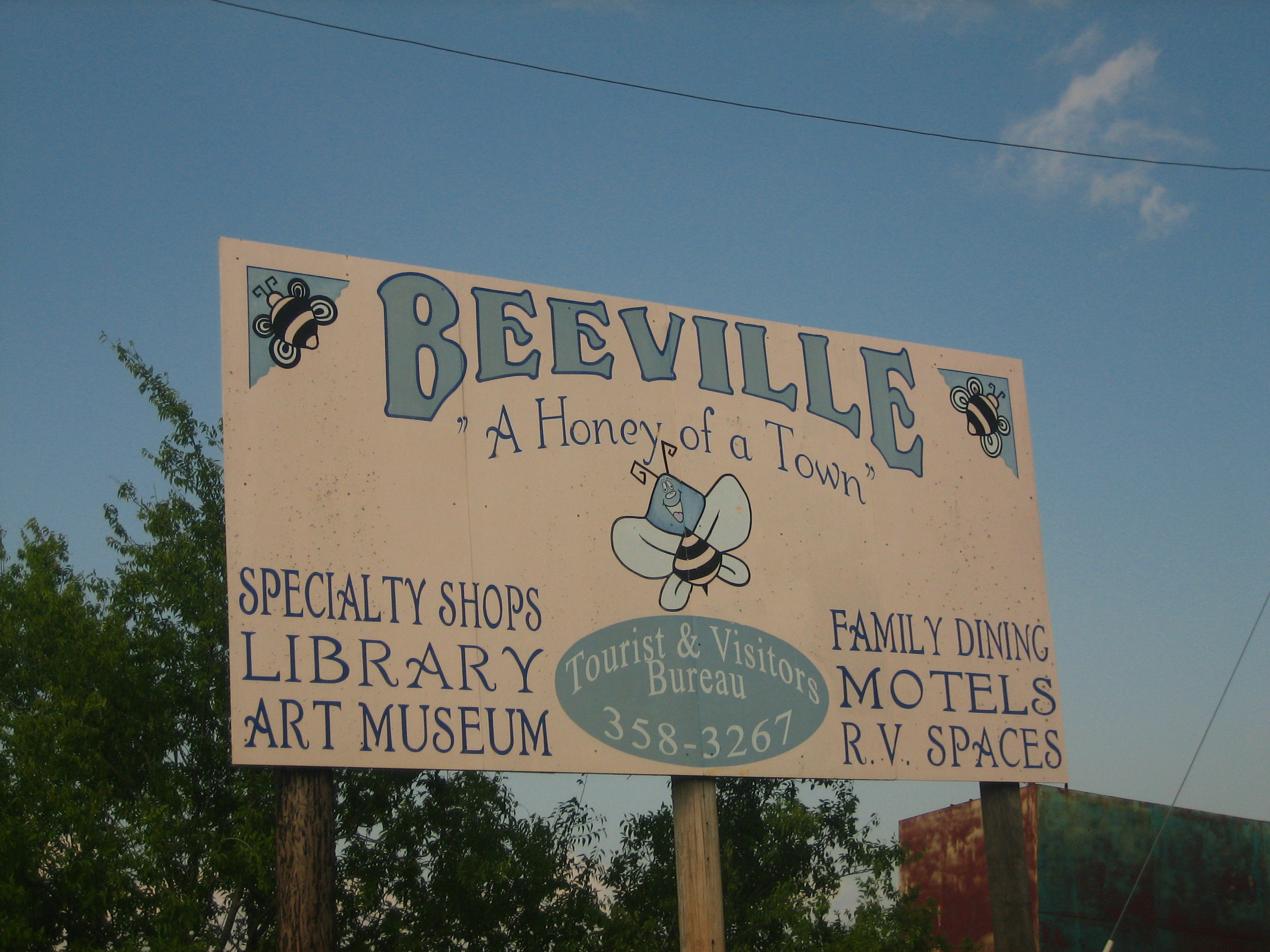
Beeville calls itself "A Honey of a Town", referencing its name.

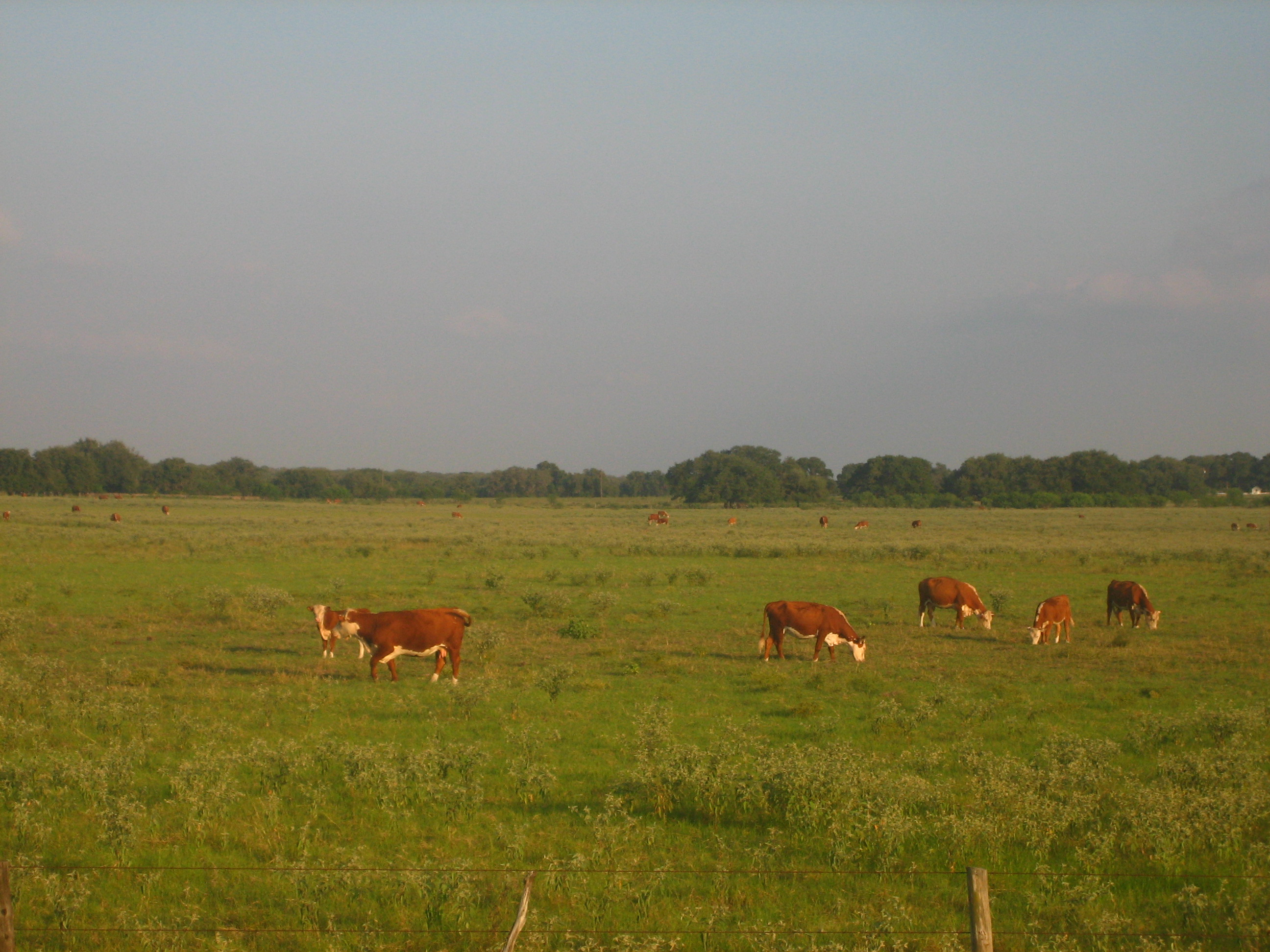
Cattle grazing on ranch lands between Beeville and Goliad, Texas

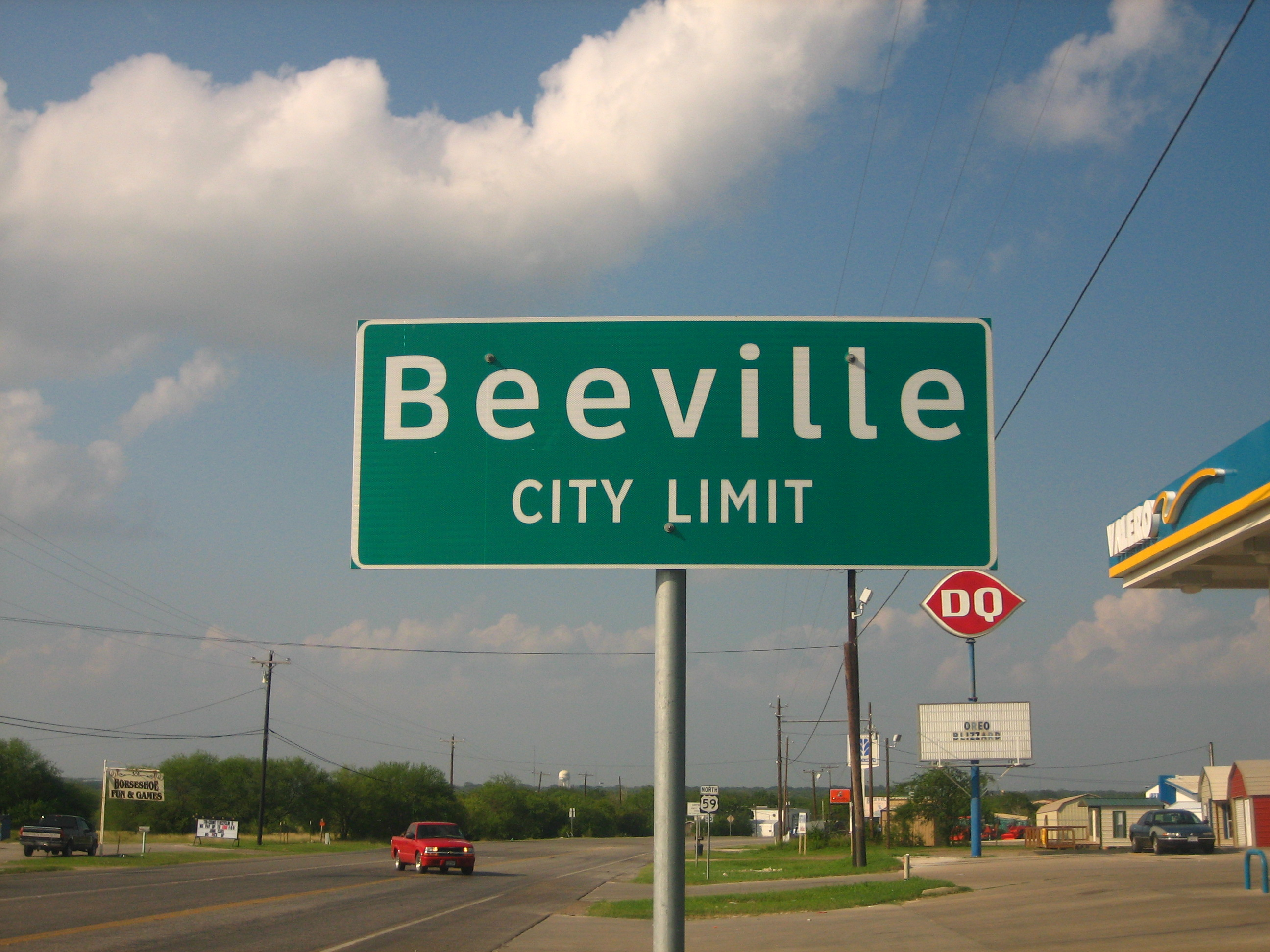
Entrance sign at Beeville, Texas

== Geography ==
The city's terrain ranges from flat to gently rolling slopes, set in the South Texas Brush Country.

Beeville is between San Antonio and Corpus Christi. Travel time to Corpus Christi is approximately one hour, and to San Antonio is about 1 1/2 hours by car. US 59 and 181 intersects at Beeville.

According to the United States Census Bureau, the city has an area of 6.1 square miles (16 km^{2}), all land.

== Climate ==
Beeville's climate is characterized by hot, humid summers and generally mild to cool winters. The temperature is influenced by the warm waters of the Gulf of Mexico. Prevailing southerly winds of 8 to 10 miles per hour (13 to 16 km/h) come off the gulf. Annual rainfall is about 30 inches (76 cm), fairly evenly distributed throughout the year. According to the Köppen climate classification, Beeville has a humid subtropical climate, Cfa on climate maps.

Climate data for Beeville, Texas (1991–2020 normals, extremes 1897–present)
| Month | Jan | Feb | Mar | Apr | May | Jun | Jul | Aug | Sep | Oct | Nov | Dec | Year |
|---|---|---|---|---|---|---|---|---|---|---|---|---|---|
| Record high °F (°C) | 91 (33) | 98 (37) | 102 (39) | 105 (41) | 107 (42) | 110 (43) | 111 (44) | 109 (43) | 110 (43) | 102 (39) | 95 (35) | 90 (32) | 111 (44) |
| Mean maximum °F (°C) | 81.5 (27.5) | 84.9 (29.4) | 87.6 (30.9) | 91.8 (33.2) | 94.9 (34.9) | 98.9 (37.2) | 99.7 (37.6) | 101.5 (38.6) | 98.3 (36.8) | 94.0 (34.4) | 87.7 (30.9) | 82.7 (28.2) | 103.0 (39.4) |
| Mean daily maximum °F (°C) | 65.5 (18.6) | 69.0 (20.6) | 74.6 (23.7) | 80.7 (27.1) | 86.8 (30.4) | 91.9 (33.3) | 93.8 (34.3) | 95.7 (35.4) | 90.4 (32.4) | 84.1 (28.9) | 74.9 (23.8) | 67.2 (19.6) | 81.2 (27.3) |
| Daily mean °F (°C) | 54.6 (12.6) | 58.2 (14.6) | 64.2 (17.9) | 70.2 (21.2) | 77.1 (25.1) | 82.1 (27.8) | 83.6 (28.7) | 84.5 (29.2) | 80.0 (26.7) | 72.7 (22.6) | 63.7 (17.6) | 56.3 (13.5) | 70.6 (21.4) |
| Mean daily minimum °F (°C) | 43.6 (6.4) | 47.4 (8.6) | 53.8 (12.1) | 59.7 (15.4) | 67.4 (19.7) | 72.2 (22.3) | 73.3 (22.9) | 73.4 (23.0) | 69.5 (20.8) | 61.3 (16.3) | 52.5 (11.4) | 45.4 (7.4) | 60.0 (15.6) |
| Mean minimum °F (°C) | 28.3 (−2.1) | 31.5 (−0.3) | 35.2 (1.8) | 43.5 (6.4) | 54.7 (12.6) | 66.0 (18.9) | 69.4 (20.8) | 69.0 (20.6) | 58.0 (14.4) | 44.5 (6.9) | 35.2 (1.8) | 29.3 (−1.5) | 25.8 (−3.4) |
| Record low °F (°C) | 12 (−11) | 11 (−12) | 17 (−8) | 29 (−2) | 42 (6) | 51 (11) | 61 (16) | 60 (16) | 44 (7) | 27 (−3) | 19 (−7) | 8 (−13) | 8 (−13) |
| Average precipitation inches (mm) | 1.77 (45) | 1.56 (40) | 2.47 (63) | 2.34 (59) | 3.08 (78) | 3.49 (89) | 3.16 (80) | 2.82 (72) | 4.10 (104) | 2.89 (73) | 2.47 (63) | 1.80 (46) | 31.95 (812) |
| Average snowfall inches (cm) | 0.0 (0.0) | 0.0 (0.0) | 0.0 (0.0) | 0.0 (0.0) | 0.0 (0.0) | 0.0 (0.0) | 0.0 (0.0) | 0.0 (0.0) | 0.0 (0.0) | 0.0 (0.0) | 0.0 (0.0) | 0.0 (0.0) | 0.0 (0.0) |
| Average precipitation days (≥ 0.01 in) | 8.2 | 7.4 | 7.1 | 5.6 | 5.9 | 7.4 | 6.1 | 5.1 | 7.7 | 5.7 | 6.3 | 7.5 | 80.0 |
| Average snowy days (≥ 0.1 in) | 0.0 | 0.0 | 0.0 | 0.0 | 0.0 | 0.0 | 0.0 | 0.0 | 0.0 | 0.0 | 0.0 | 0.0 | 0.0 |
Source: NOAA

== Demographics ==
Historical population
| Census | Pop. | Note | %± |
|---|---|---|---|
| 1880 | 208 | | — |
| 1890 | 1,311 | | 530.3% |
| 1910 | 3,269 | | — |
| 1920 | 3,063 | | −6.3% |
| 1930 | 4,806 | | 56.9% |
| 1940 | 6,789 | | 41.3% |
| 1950 | 9,348 | | 37.7% |
| 1960 | 13,811 | | 47.7% |
| 1970 | 13,506 | | −2.2% |
| 1980 | 14,574 | | 7.9% |
| 1990 | 13,547 | | −7.0% |
| 2000 | 13,129 | | −3.1% |
| 2010 | 12,863 | | −2.0% |
| 2020 | 13,669 | | 6.3% |
U.S. Decennial Census

=== 2020 census ===
As of the 2020 census, Beeville had a population of 13,669 living in 5,067 households and 3,164 families; the median age was 33.5 years, 27.6% of residents were under the age of 18, and 13.8% of residents were 65 years of age or older. For every 100 females there were 94.0 males, and for every 100 females age 18 and over there were 92.0 males age 18 and over.

98.8% of residents lived in urban areas, while 1.2% lived in rural areas.

Among the 5,067 households, 37.1% had children under the age of 18 living in them, 37.0% were married-couple households, 20.0% were households with a male householder and no spouse or partner present, and 34.3% were households with a female householder and no spouse or partner present. About 27.7% of all households were made up of individuals and 11.1% had someone living alone who was 65 years of age or older.

There were 5,902 housing units, of which 14.1% were vacant. Among occupied housing units, 49.7% were owner-occupied and 50.3% were renter-occupied. The homeowner vacancy rate was 3.0% and the rental vacancy rate was 14.1%.

Racial composition as of the 2020 census
| Race | Percent |
|---|---|
| White | 53.3% |
| Black or African American | 3.5% |
| American Indian and Alaska Native | 0.9% |
| Asian | 1.0% |
| Native Hawaiian and Other Pacific Islander | <0.1% |
| Some other race | 15.0% |
| Two or more races | 26.3% |
| Hispanic or Latino (of any race) | 73.2% |

== Government and infrastructure ==
The Beeville City Council consists of five council members, each elected from one of the city's five wards. Every year, the council members determine who among them will be mayor and mayor pro tempore. The current council members are Mayor Mike Willow, Mayor pro tempore Benny Puente Jr., Crystal Franco, Ray Garcia Jr., and Cyndi Carrasco, representing wards 1 through 5 respectively.

The city has nine parks scattered among the neighborhoods, with a swimming pool at Martin Luther King-City Pool Park.

=== Prisons ===
The Texas Department of Criminal Justice operates the Correctional Institutions Division Region IV Office on the grounds of the Chase Field Industrial Complex, the former Naval Air Station Chase Field, near Beeville. In addition, Garza East Unit and Garza West Unit transfer facilities are co-located on the grounds of the naval air station; and the McConnell Unit lies about 1 mile (1.6 km) outside the city limits. The Beeville Distribution Center is on the grounds of the air station.

Joseph T. Hallinan, the author of the 2001 book Going Up the River: Travels in a Prison Nation, described Beeville as a prison town. At the time, Beeville was trying to attract more prison business since the employment is stable. Hallinan wrote that Beeville was attempting to be "a prison hub, becoming roughly what Pittsburgh is to steel or Detroit is to cars".

== Education ==
Beeville is served by the Beeville Independent School District, which has about 3,500 students in six schools.

A. C. Jones High School contains a turfed football stadium and a softball and baseball complex. Sports include golf, basketball, baseball, softball, powerlifting, soccer, tennis, track, wrestling, and cheerleading. The teams are the Trojans and Lady Trojans, and their colors are orange and white. Other extracurricular programs include the Dazzlers Dance Team, band, choir, and theater arts.

All of Bee County is in the Bee County College District (doing business as Coastal Bend College), according to the Texas Education Code. The main campus of Coastal Bend College in Beeville opened in 1967 with 790 students. Today it has over 3,700 students, more than 1,200 of them full-time. Dormitories and apartments on campus provide affordable housing. The community college offers an associate degree in 26 different fields. Other campuses are in Alice, Kingsville, and Pleasanton.

== Library ==
The Joe Barnhart Bee County Library is in downtown Beeville, directly across the street from the Bee County Courthouse.

== Art museum ==
The Beeville Art Museum is a teaching museum, relying on traveling exhibitions. It is in the Esther Barnhart House. The house was built in 1910 by the R. L. Hodges family and occupied by their descendants until 1975. In 1981, the Hodges House and adjacent acreage were purchased by Joe Barnhart of Houston. He named the house the Esther Barnhart House, after his mother, and developed the land into a community park, named the Joe Barnhart Park after his father.

== Notable people ==
- Byron Bradfute, National Football League player
- James Gunn, Princeton astronomer, 2008 National Medal of Science
- Rudy Jaramillo, Major League Baseball player and coach
- Cyndi Taylor Krier, San Antonio politician, born in Beeville
- Edmundo Mireles Jr., FBI agent involved in the 1986 FBI Miami shootout
- Marianne Rafferty, Fox News presenter and reporter
- Eddie Taubensee, Major League Baseball player
- Curt Walker, outfielder for the Philadelphia Phillies

== See also ==
- List of municipalities in Texas
