= Pettus =

Pettus may refer to:

== People with the surname ==
- Pettus baronets, a baronetcy of England
- Senator Pettus (disambiguation), several senators
- Augustine Pettus (16th century), forebear of the Pettus baronets
- Bill Pettus (1884–1924), U.S. baseball player
- Dedra Pettus (died 1981)
- Dell Pettus (born 2001), American football player
- Edmund Pettus (1821–1907), a Confederate Brigadier General in the American Civil War, and later U.S. politician
- Ethan Pettis (1994) author of novels such as Primitive War.
- Horatio Pettus, several of the Pettus baronets
- John Pettus (disambiguation), several people
- Phillip Pettus, U.S. politician
- Terry Pettus (1904–1984), a U.S. journalist
- Thomas Pettus, several of the Pettus baronets
  - Thomas Pettus (17th century), the High Sheriff of Norfolk for whom the Pettus baronets of Norfolk, England were created
- William Grymes Pettus (1794–1867), a U.S. politician
- George Pettus Raney (1845–1911), U.S. politician, attorney, judge
- Horatio Pettus Mackintosh Berney-Ficklin (1892–1961), British army officer
- Stephen Pettus Read (1841–1917), U.S. politician
- Walter Pettus Gewin (1908–1981), U.S. judge
- William Pettus Hobby, Sr. (1878–1964), U.S. publisher and politician
- William Pettus Hobby, Jr. (born 1932), U.S. politician

== Places ==
- Pettus, Arkansas, United States; an unincorporated community
- Pettus, Texas, United States; a census-designated-place
  - Pettus Independent School District, Texas, USA
- Pettus, West Virginia, United States
- Terry Pettus Park, Seattle, Washington, United States
- Pettus Glacier, Trinity Peninsula, Antarctic Peninsula, Antarctica

== Other uses ==
- Edmund Pettus Bridge, Selma, Alabama, USA; over the Alabama River; notable in civil rights history and named after the Confederate Brigadier General
- Pettus High School, Pettus, Texas, USA
- Four Locust Farm or Pettus Dairy Farm, Keysville, Charlotte County, Virginia. USA; an NRHP-listed home

== See also ==
- Pettusville, Alabama, United States
