= St Simon and St Jude's Church, Norwich =

St Simon and St Jude
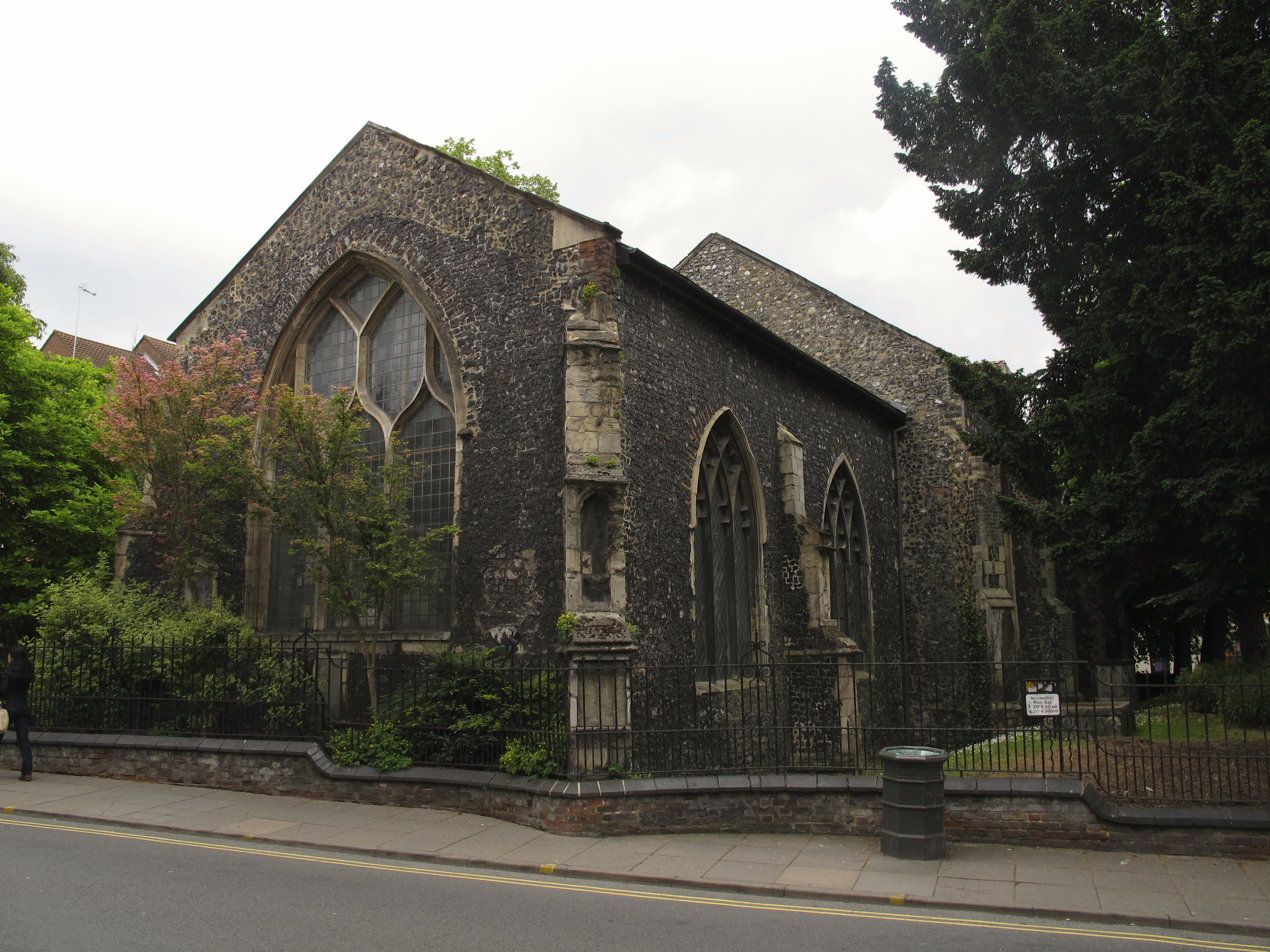
- St Simon and St Jude’s Church, Norwich
- St Simon and St Jude
- 52°37′55.37″N 1°17′51.51″E
- OS grid reference: TG 23254 08916
- Location: Norwich, Norfolk
- Address: 49 Elm Hill
- Country: England
- Denomination: Church of England

History
- Dedication: St Simon and St Jude

Architecture
- Heritage designation: Grade I listed
- Closed: 1892

St Simon and St Jude is a Grade I listed redundant parish church in Norwich. Located at the foot of the south-east side of Elm Hill, it was in existence prior to the Norman Conquest. During the 16th and 17th centuries, the church harboured significant Catholic recusancy and nonconformism, though this was opposed by other parishioners and successive bishops of Norwich. From around 1870, attendance began to drop, and in 1892 the church was declared redundant, its parish being united into that of St George Tombland in 1894.

After redundancy, the church became a Sunday school until 1918, during which time the tower partially fell in 1911. The church sat empty between 1920 and 1952, after which it became the Norwich Scouts and Guides' central headquarters until 1997, undergoing significant interior modernisation. After housing a boxing gym and dance studio, it became home to theatre company Curious Directive from December 2018. The church is as of November 2026 on Historic England's Heritage at Risk Register, in a "very bad" condition.

== History ==
The church is dedicated to the saints Simon and Jude, both apostles of Jesus; there are only three English pre-Reformation churches with this dedication. The church's existence is recorded in the Domesday Book, which notes that 'Bishop Ailmer held the church of St Simon and St Jude before 1066, later Herfast, now William; three quarters of one mill, half an acre of meadow and one dwelling are attached to this and it is not of the bishopric but of Bishop Alimer's patrimony". It is one of only seven Norwich churches mentioned in the book by name. It may have begun as a bishop's chapel, in use as a meeting place for diocesan clergy and administrators. The land, house, and mill were likely alienated from the church during the reign of William the Conqueror, though the rights to the church were given to successive bishops until around 1200.

The church was deemed to be worth 20 shillings in the 1254 Valuation, and 40 shillings by 1291. By 1297, St Simon and St Jude's, as well as the Norwich church of St Swithin, the church at Crostwick and the deaneries of Norwich and Taverham, were held by Thomas Silvester. The earliest present church fabric dates to c. 1310 to 1320, during this period. Silvester died in 1329, and the bishop separated the churches and deaneries. The church experienced a fire which may have been related to the 1443 Gladman's Rising, with a post-fire phase of reconstruction occurring in the mid-15th century, likely overseen by rector John Howlot and funded by bequests from individuals such as alderman William Grey in 1449. The nave had likely neared re-completion by 1446.

Thomas Whalle, Mayor of Norwich in 1567, resided in St Simon and St Jude's parish. Whalle was in strong opposition to the Elizabethan Strangers and had tendencies toward Catholicism; he became the head of an anti-reformed circle in the parish, with some parish members taking part in forms of worship frowned upon by more stringent Protestants in Norwich. Bishop Parkhurst wrote to his chancellor in 1572, complaining of the "great abuse and disorder" committed by "persons that had vowed themselves contrarye to God and good ordynances, so fareth it with the most parte of that paryshe". He wrote that on one evening prayer, "three or four lewde boyes", likely from the Cathedral, had prevented the minister from reading the Magnificat, when they "brast out singing of the same sodenlye". One of these boys is highly likely to have been a cathedral chorister. The group also rang the church bell during sermons. Parkhurst was assured in return that other parishioners were "of the godlye sorte". Recognising a requirement for strong leadership, Bishop Freake collated two bishops to the church in succession, Germain Gardiner and Thomas Thwaites. Thwaites occupied the living from 1582 to 1604 but was not qualified for pastoral work, having not graduated; he did not preach and in 1597 was presented for neglecting several duties. In the 1580s, Catholic recusancy became stronger within the parish.

During the 17th century, the parish had the second-most significant nonconformist population in the city after St Clement's. The cleric John Ward was collated to St Simon and St Jude's by Bishop Jegon in 1604, resigning from this position in 1616 after also being collated to St Swithin's in 1608. This is a different John Ward to the contemporaneous other John Ward who officiated at St Michael's church, and different to John Ward, the brother of Ipswich lecturer Samuel Ward. Doctor Thomas Lushington, while officiating a communion service, preached free will and elevated the sacraments above his head in a manner deemed popish by some people present. The act caused uproar, with some individuals leaving the church and one declaring his intention to leave for New England.

The church saw good attendance; in the 1851 religious census, the small church was recorded to have an adult morning congregation of 500 people. Attendance remained strong until around 1870, when it went into decline.

=== 1892–present: Redundancy ===
In 1892, St Simon and St Jude's was declared redundant and its parish was united into that of St George Tombland in 1894. Then, it operated as a Sunday school until 1918. In 1911, the church's tower partially fell, and has been a jagged stump since; it was not rebuilt due to the church's redundant status. The Sunday school left the building and it went into decay between 1920 and 1952. Though the church went into decay, with ivy nearly covering the church by 1938, a planned demolition of the church was halted by the work of the Norwich Society. In 1952, it became the central headquarters of the Norwich Scouts and Guides. This resulted in a significant modernisation of the building, with a shop being built. In 1972, the church became a Grade I listed building. In 1997, the Scouts left the building.

A boxing gym and dance studio also operated in the building after the Scouts left. In 2018, it was announced that the Norwich Historic Churches Trust (NHCT) was to open the building to the public for daily interior viewing. From December 2018, theatre company Curious Directive were based at the church. In 2020 during the COVID-19 pandemic, they opened a bar in the church's garden to raise money for their future projects. They continued this as a pop-up each summer, and in 2023 announced that they would open an indoor bar, The Potting Shed, in the church in February 2024. In November 2025, NHCT submitted plans for the repair of the church's tower. These repairs were underway in July 2026. The church as of November 2026 remains on Historic England's Heritage at Risk Register, in a "very bad" condition.

== Architecture ==
The church building dates from the 14th and 15th centuries and is made of flint, and features stone brick dressings with a slate roof. It has a nave, chancel and west tower.

The chancel was built earlier than the nave, and is of two bays. Its plan has been retained since the early 14th century. Its exterior fabric is made of squared black flints and red brick. It features angled buttresses, each supporting a niche with cusped arches above and projecting corbels below, made for a statue. These are similar to detail on architecture associated with the Ramsey family, including St Ethelbert's Gate and the 1310s Canary Chapel. There are two shallow and arched recesses in the interior of the chancel east wall, likely for statues; these were uncovered in 1932, and are similar to those in St Laurence's church in South Walsham. The chancel windows have cusped, intersecting tracery, from the same time as the niches, similar to that in the aisles of the nave of Norwich Cathedral, which have been credited to John Salmon (1299–1325). The east window is wide. It is from the 16th or 17th century; it replaced a former one which was in a Decorated style. Its plain intersecting tracery is similar in form to the 1320s window tracery of the south walk of the Norwich Cathedral cloister. The voussoirs over the windows alternate between flint and brick. Inside, the chancel arch had responds at either end which were half-quatrefoils in terms of their plan. There was a 14th-century chancel screen, though this was destroyed by fire and replaced. Dating to the mid-15th century, a new south-east window was added to the chancel as well as a steeper roof that is supported by stone corbels carved as angels. For a time, the chancel was divided into several small rooms, though this was cleared in 2008. The present chancel arch encases earlier chancel arch mouldings.

The nave was built in 1415, though was partially rebuilt by 1446 following a fire; it is unclear whether it was widened. It is of four bays. It has a north doorway that has attached shafts and a four-centre arch. The door itself is two-leaf and has tracery panels. On the south wall of the nave is high-quality flint work. The nave windows have two-centre arches and are three-light, with cusped ogee heads that support daggers at the sides that frame four tracery lights; the central two of these tracery lights also have ogees and quatrefoils sit between them. Only some of the daggers contain glass that has remained in situ, decorated with leaves and in grisaille with yellow staining. These windows are Perpendicular in style, their tracery matching a mid-15th-century date, accompanied by the remains of some medieval glazing. The nave roof is likely also from the mid-15th century; it features arch-braced principals and collars that are above wall posts. Centred on the tops of the windows are another set of trusses. At the midpoint of the rafters, they rest on purlins. Inside, the nave is divided in half by a concrete floor inserted in the 1950s. There is a remaining west gallery, built during the church's use by the Norwich Scouts and Guides organisation.

The tower saw a partial rebuilding in the mid-15th century, atop the foundations and lower section of an earlier version of the tower from the 14th century. Evidence of the upper tower's design before the 1820s can be seen in 18th-century sketches by John Kirkpatrick. Its crenellated parapet was decorated with limestone diamonds and it had pinnacles on its corners. These details match the style of the towers of St George Colegate, St Clement Colegate, and St George Tombland, dating to c. 1445. In the 1820s, the tower was reworked to have a more simple design, as depicted by James Sillett. Having partially fallen in 1911, the remainder of the church tower has a stair turret. It has no buttresses.

== Furnishings and monuments ==
Though the church's box pews and classical-style reredos with semi-circular communion rails remained until around 1900 when a photograph was taken of them, the church's furnishings have since been completely removed. The church's altar table resided in the Lady chapel of St George Tombland. The church's second-latest organ was moved to Sidestrand, whereas its successor from 1887 was moved to Scarning.

The church has two monuments to former Mayors of Norwich from the Pettus family, and their families; Thomas (left) and John (right)

There are monuments to the Pettus family, who had a house on Elm Hill, on either side of church's chancel arch. These include one to Mayor of Norwich in 1590, Thomas Pettus (d. 1597), with his wife Christian Dethick and his sons on the south side. It was erected by Thomas's son, Sir John Pettus (d. 1614), who was the Mayor of Norwich in 1608; a monument to John with his wife Bridget Curtis and two sons and daughter is on the north side. The latter monument also names Augustus Pettus (d. 1613) and his wife and son. It depicts John's reclining effigy dressed in armour, above which is a kneeling effigy of Augustine. This monument was erected by John's brother, also named Thomas Pettus. The monuments saw conservation in 2008.

== Burials ==
Burials at the church include:

- John Selby, chaplain who in 1446 requested burial beside a window paid for by his mother and father.
- William Grey, alderman who in 1449 requested burial next to the altar of St Mary on the north side of the church.
- John Howlot, rector until his death on 6 June 1462, buried at the chancel entrance.

== Location ==
The church is located at the foot of the south-east side of Elm Hill, on its corner with Wensum Street, formerly known as Cookrow, which leads to Fye Bridge. Its churchyard is small at a size of around a quarter acre, half of this being occupied by the church building.

== Parish ==
The northern parish boundary of St Simon and St Jude's stopped at the River Wensum. Over the river, the parish faced that of St Clement's. TThe eastern boundary of the parish was slightly east of Pigg Lane, St Martin at Palace's parish being on the other side of this boundary. On the east side of Wensum Street, the southern boundary is located just south of an area that was occupied by the Bishop's house during or immediately after the Norman Conquest, now occupied by the Maid's Head Hotel. When on the west side of Wensum Street, the southern boundary is located next to the southern edge of the churchyard. To the west, the boundary incorporated a single messuage on the south side of Elm Hill, later occupied by Pettus House, before running back north to the river mostly along the west side of Towler's Court. The parish is also bordered by that of St Peter Hungate.

Richard Suckling, an alderman and baker as well as Sheriff of Norwich in 1545, resided in the parish. Thomas Browne settled in Norwich between 1635 and 1637, with his residence in Tombland being only a few yards from the church.
