= Tuleta =

Tuleta may refer to:

- Tuleta, Texas, a town
- Tuleta Hills, Wisconsin, USA, an unincorporated community
- Operation Tuleta, a British police investigation
