= Pettus Secondary School =

Location
- 500 North May Street; Pettus, Bee County, Texas 78146-1149; United States; 28.624431°N 97.801739°W

Information
- School type: Public middle school and high school
- Locale: Rural: Distant
- School district: Pettus ISD
- NCES School ID: 483477003899
- Principal: Ricky Deleon
- Staff: 21.45 (on an FTE basis)
- Grades: 6–12
- Enrollment: 209 (2023–2024)
- Student to teacher ratio: 9.74
- Colors: Maroon & Gold
- Athletics conference: UIL Class 2A
- Mascot: War Eagle
- Yearbook: The Eagle
- Website: Pettus High School

Pettus Secondary School is a public middle school and public high school situated in Pettus, Texas (USA) and is classified as a 2A school by the UIL. It is part of the Pettus Independent School District located in northern Bee County and southern Karnes County. As the sole comprehensive middle and high school in its district, its attendance boundary includes Pettus, Normanna, Tuleta, and Tulsita. During 2023–2024, Pettus Secondary School had an enrollment of 209 students and a student to teacher ratio of 9.74. The school received an overall rating of "B" from the Texas Education Agency for the 2024–2025 school year.

== Athletics ==
The Pettus Eagles compete in these sports -

- Baseball
- Basketball
- Cross Country
- Football
- Golf
- Powerlifting
- Softball
- Track and Field
- Volleyball
