= Gybson's Conduit =

Monument in Norwich, UK

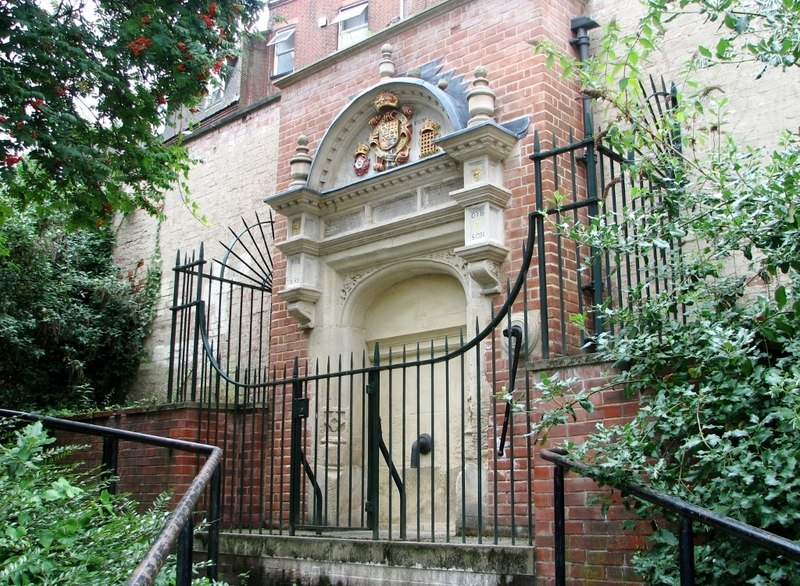
- The conduit after its 2009–2011 restoration
- The conduit was moved to face north here in the 1980s
- 52.631134°N 1.290746°E
- Location: Westwick Street, Norwich, England
- OS grid reference: TG 22803 08785

Gybson's Conduit, initially known as St Lawrence's Well, is a well conduit monument next to Westwick Street in Norwich which took water from Saint Lawrence's spring. Completed in 1577, it has protected status as a Scheduled Monument, and is a major piece of stonework in the Early Renaissance style.

== History ==
=== 1547–77: Creation and renaming ===
Prior to the creation of the conduit, in 1547 the people of Norwich were granted access to a common lane which allowed them right of access to Saint Lawrence's spring. This was under the condition that they gated the lane and kept this gate closed at night.

Robert Gibson, a wealthy brewer and Sheriff of Norwich, acquired the land on which the spring resided, taking it into private ownership, in 1576 or 1577, under the condition that he install a pump to bring water from the well for parishioners through a lead cock, or conduit. He thus closed this lane and built the conduit in the same time frame, initially named Saynt Laurens Wel (Saint Lawrence's Well). It was intended to bring water from Saint Lawrence's spring to the local population. Historian Brian Ayers has said that its construction may have been a display of Gybson's generosity to the people as well as his power over their basic needs, consolidating his own status as a man of influence. An inscription on the conduit reads:

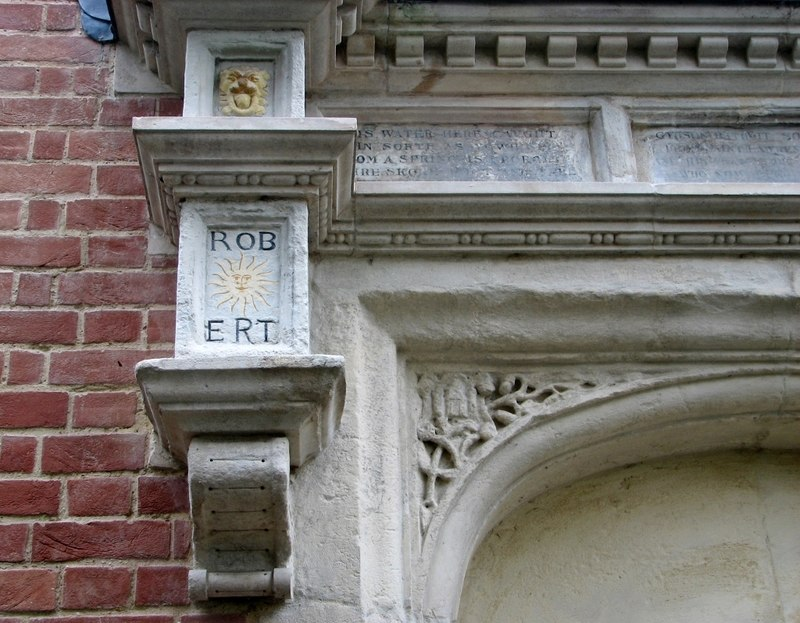
The conduit features details in an Early Renaissance style and an inscribed poem

Gybson hath it soughte
From Saynt Laurens Wel
And his charg this wrowghte
Who now here doe dwel

Thy case was his cost, not smal,
Vouchsafed wel of those
Which thankful be his Worke to se,
And thereto be no Foes.

=== 1578–1860s: Renaming and relocation ===
In 1578, the conduit was renamed to Gybson's Well, possibly due to a removal of clerical sponsorship to the well. In 1602, Gybson defied precautions against the plague when he was an alderman, contradicting his proclaimed benevolence toward the public health. The conduit was eventually reinstalled on the wall of Lower Westwick Street's Anchor Brewery, a building which was largely built in the 1860s.

=== 1980–present: Movement and conservation ===
Having initially faced south into Westwick Street, it was reset in a boundary wall during the 1980s, during the building of the Anchor Quay development, and now faces north into the development's central courtyard. It was then purchased from the Crown Estate by the Norwich Preservation Trust using a grant from the Norwich Society. It was restored from 2009 to 2011 by the Trust, with financial assistance from English Heritage, the John Jarrold Trust, the Paul Bassham Charitable Trust and Norfolk County Council. This was the first restoration of a scheduled monument by the Trust, involving the repair of extensive water damage and vandalism as well as detailed replication of the original paintwork.
