= John Pettus =

John Pettus may refer to:

- John Jones Pettus (1813–1867), U.S. politician
- Sir John Pettus (c. 1640-1698), 3rd Baronet of the Pettus Baronetcy
- John Pettus (MP for Norwich), Member of Parliament for Norwich 1604–1611
- John Pettus (courtier), (c. 1613-1685), elected Fellow of the Royal Society
