= Senator Pettus (disambiguation) =

Edmund Pettus (1821–1907) was a U.S. Senator from Alabama from 1897 to 1907.

Senator Pettus may also refer to:

- John J. Pettus (1813–1867), Mississippi State Senate
- William Grymes Pettus (1794–1867), Missouri State Senate

== See also ==
- Pettus (disambiguation)
