= Nostalgia Nerd =

British Internet personality

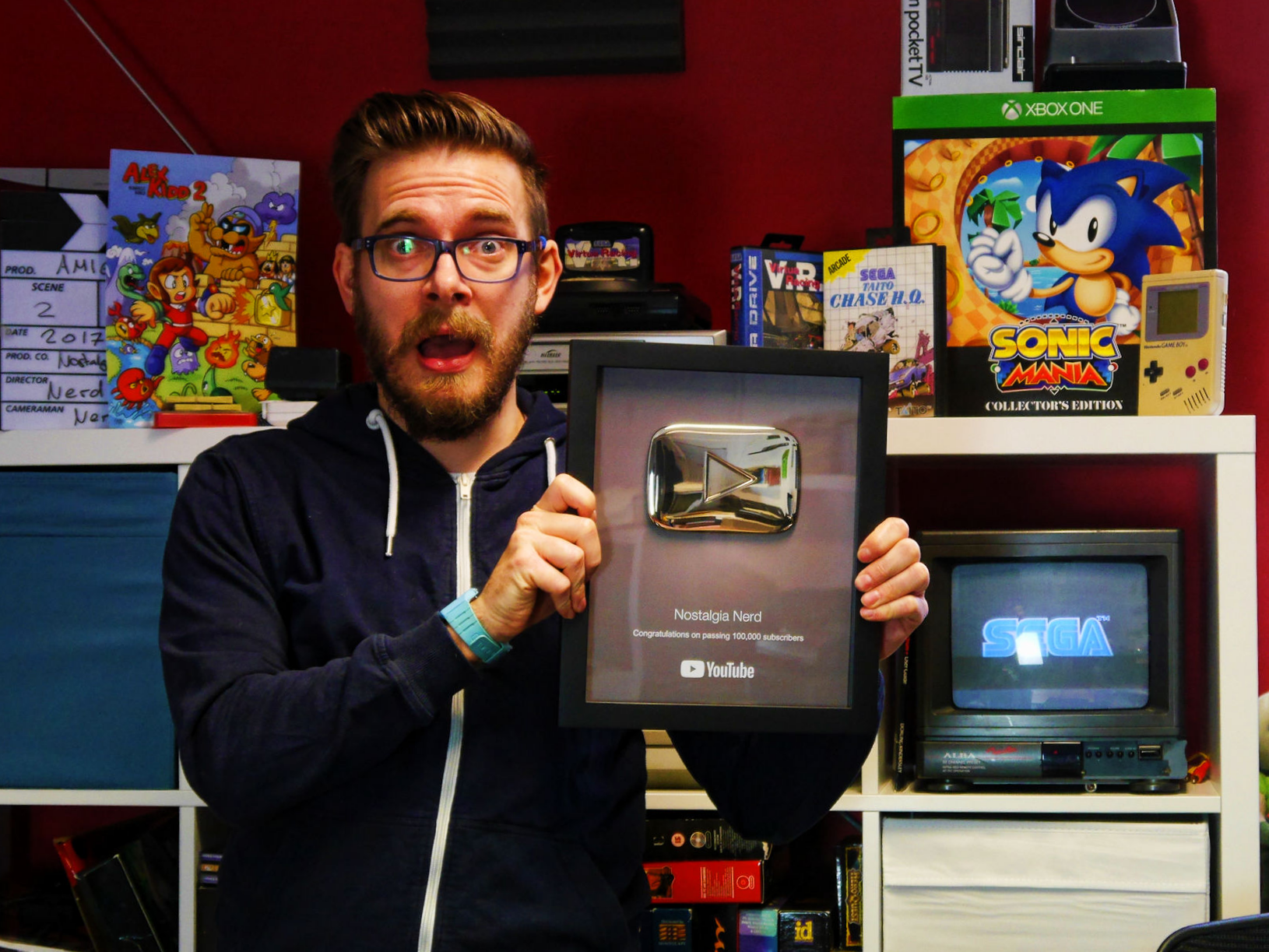
- Peter Leigh holding Silver Play button in December 2017
- Born: Peter Leigh
- Occupations: Presenter; author

X information
- Handle: @nostalnerd
- Display name: Nostalgia Nerd
- Followers: 24.4 thousand

YouTube information
- Channel: Nostalgia Nerd
- Years active: 2015–present
- Genre: Technology
- Subscribers: 578 thousand
- Views: 96.4 million
- Last updated: 3 November 2025

Peter Leigh, more commonly known by the alias Nostalgia Nerd, is a British presenter, YouTuber, author and Twitch streamer, who documents and specialises in ageing technology and software. First appearing on YouTube in 2014, he routinely and enthusiastically explores forgotten computers and the technology surrounding them. He often specialises in historical documentaries on vintage computing, but also delves into technical explanations. Leigh also ventures into modern, mystery, explanation and more frivolous tech videos, with a humorous style and British wit.

His book, The Nostalgia Nerd's Retro Tech, spent several months as a best-seller in the UK and USA. Covering a wide variety of retro systems with historical and gaming facts, it has been mentioned on the UK's Centre for Computing History's website and is a reference in the museum.

As of July 2025, his main YouTube channel has 576,000 subscribers and 712 videos.

== Early life and education ==
Leigh was born in Norwich, England in the early 1980s. The younger of two siblings, he spent much of his childhood engaging with such British micros as the ZX Spectrum, BBC Micro and models from further afield, including the Commodore 64.

He attended Cromer High School, before studying Business Law and ICT at Paston College. He previously worked as a Lead Program Developer, and ran a web development business in 2012.

== Career ==
Leigh first began producing YouTube videos in 2014, under the alias of RetroBait. He created the Nostalgia Nerd channel shortly after, and began creating videos as a part-time hobby. His early videos ranged from unboxing old tech to game reviews, before moving to in-depth system histories which propelled the channel forward. These are created in a documentary style, focused on the histories of various computer systems and consoles from the past.

In 2017, Leigh moved full-time to YouTube production. He stated that, due to the time involved with research, editing and production, along with the desire to improve quality and historical accuracy; continuing his parallel career of website development alongside video production would be detrimental to both pursuits, preferring to put focus into video creation.

In 2018, Leigh appeared on Mexican television showcasing the retro computing scene in the UK. In the same year, he appeared in several episodes of the Kickstarter-backed web series, Digitiser the Show, as himself.

In 2018, Leigh wrote The Nostalgia Nerd's Retro Tech. This book was published in November 2018 by ILEX Press. To date, it has sold approximately 50,000 copies, and appeared in various scholar-related texts.

Leigh has appeared as a guest author in numerous national press publications, as well as UK radio shows, advocating retro technology. One of which was Chris Goreham's BBC Radio Norfolk breakfast show, where he discussed the mystery of the Elm Hill fossilised keyboard in Norwich.

On 3 February 2021, Leigh appeared on the UK based Channel 4 television show, Steph's Packed Lunch, discussing vintage computers and their values.

He frequently appears as a guest speaker at retro-themed events, including Play Expo by Replay Events, as well as a Primark retro themed clothing event alongside Pac-Man record holder, Jon Stoodley.

As of February 2021, Leigh has collaborated with several other significant YouTube producers, including LGR, Ashens, Did You Know Gaming, Octavius King and Slopes Game Room. He also co-hosts The Octanerdle podcast with Octavius King.

In March 2023, Leigh launched a kickstarter campaign to open an arcade bar in Norwich called Barcadia. The fundraising campaign was successful, with 381 backers pledging £27,781 for the project. Leigh appeared in many newspaper articles, including blaming roadworks in the area for the poor attendance while backers complained about missing perks from the campaign along with negative comments being deleted. At the beginning of 2025, the Barcadia website was updated to show it was 'Temporarily closed' and Barcadia shut down for good in 2025. In an interview with Time Extension Leigh said 'It became painfully obvious by six months in, that the venue was going to struggle, but given our priority was always a community space over profit, we hoped to press on and get to a place where it could at least sustain itself.'

== Notable documentaries ==
Through source interviews, research and discovery, Nostalgia Nerd is known for creating content on an array of forgotten or unknown subjects related to vintage technology.

Examples include the explanation and deep dive into the early 00's 96KB FPS, kkrieger. The investigation and solving of the "Fossilised Keyboard Mystery", and various historical and research documentaries; including the rise and fall of Cyrix processors, the history of the failed internet sensation, Beenz, analysis of the alternative Sega Genesis Street Fighter 2 Game and a documentary about 1990s Star Trek PC Peripherals.

== Personal life ==
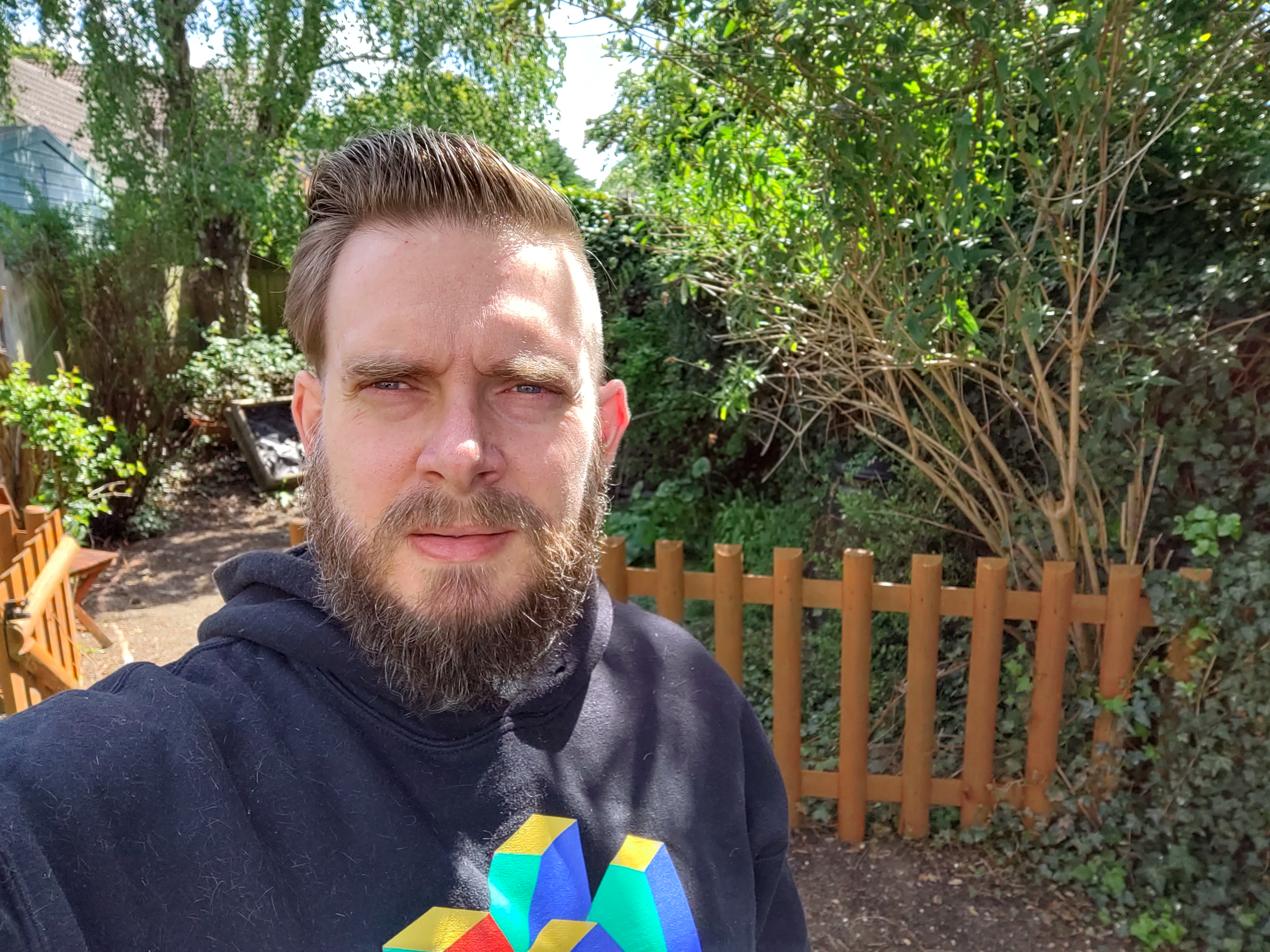
Peter Leigh in 2020

As of 2021, Leigh lives in Norwich, Norfolk. He has two children who have appeared in older videos.

== Bibliography ==
Year	Title	Notes
2017	Attack of the Flickering Skeletons (Stuart Ashen)	Contributor
2018	The Nostalgia Nerd's Retro Tech	

== Filmography ==
=== Television ===
Year	Title	Role	Notes
2021	Steph's Packed Lunch	Himself	Discussing the revival of vintage computers, their use and how much they're worth

=== Film ===
Year	Title	Role	Notes
2020	Ashens and the Polybius Heist	Tech supplier	Credited
2021	Odd Pod: The Movie... kinda	Nostalgia Nerd	Upcoming film based on The Odd Pod show

=== Web series ===
Year	Title	Role	Notes
2017	LGR: Choosing a Retro Gaming PC	Himself	1 episode, guest
2018	Blockbusters: Video Games & The Internet	Himself	Panellist on the YouTube channel, Ashens
2018	Digitiser: The Show	Himself	
2018	Barshens	Himself	1 episode
2019	Digitiser Live	Himself	
2019	Did You Know Gaming	Narrator	1 episode
