= Stardust (2007 film) =

2007 film by Matthew Vaughn

- Theatrical release poster
- Directed by: Matthew Vaughn
- Screenplay by: Jane Goldman; Matthew Vaughn
- Based on: Stardust by Neil Gaiman
- Produced by: Matthew Vaughn; Lorenzo di Bonaventura; Michael Dreyer; Neil Gaiman
- Starring: Claire Danes; Charlie Cox; Sienna Miller; Ricky Gervais; Jason Flemyng; Rupert Everett; Peter O'Toole; Michelle Pfeiffer; Robert De Niro
- Cinematography: Ben Davis
- Edited by: Jon Harris
- Music by: Ilan Eshkeri
- Production companies: Paramount Pictures; Marv Films; Ingenious Film Partners
- Distributed by: Paramount Pictures
- Release dates: 29 July 2007 (Paramount Studio Theatre); 10 August 2007 (United States); 19 October 2007 (United Kingdom)
- Running time: 128 minutes
- Countries: United States; United Kingdom
- Language: English
- Budget: $70–88.5 million
- Box office: $137 million

Stardust is a 2007 romantic fantasy adventure film directed by Matthew Vaughn and co-written by Vaughn and Jane Goldman. Based on Neil Gaiman's 1999 novel, it features an ensemble cast led by Claire Danes, Charlie Cox, Sienna Miller, Ricky Gervais, Jason Flemyng, Rupert Everett, Peter O'Toole, Michelle Pfeiffer and Robert De Niro, with narration by Ian McKellen.

The film follows Tristan, a young man from the fictional town of Wall in England. Wall is a town on the border of the magical fantasy kingdom of Stormhold. Tristan enters the magical world to collect a fallen star to give to his beloved Victoria, in return for her hand in marriage. He finds the star, who to his surprise, is a woman named Yvaine. Witches and the Princes of Stormhold are also hunting for Yvaine. Meanwhile, Tristan tries to get her back to Wall with him before Victoria's birthday, the deadline for her offer.

The film was released to positive reviews and grossed $137 million on a $70–88.5 million budget. In 2008 it won the Hugo Award for Best Dramatic Presentation, Long Form. It was released on DVD, Blu-ray and HD DVD on 18 December 2007.

== Plot ==
The English village of Wall lies near a stone wall that borders the magical kingdom of Stormhold. A guard prevents anyone from crossing. Dunstan Thorne tricks him and crosses over the wall to a marketplace. He meets Una, an enslaved princess who offers him a glass snowdrop in exchange for a kiss. They spend the night together. Nine months later, the guard delivers a baby named Tristan to Dunstan.

Eighteen years later, the dying King of Stormhold throws a ruby into the sky: his successor will be the first of his sons to recover it. The gem hits a star, and both fall out of the sky, landing in Stormhold. Princes Primus and Septimus search for the stone separately.

In Wall, Tristan and Victoria see the falling star. He vows to retrieve it in return for her hand in marriage. Despite his mother being from beyond the wall, he cannot get past the guard. He receives a Babylon candle that she left for him, which can take the user to any desired location. Tristan lights it and is transported to the fallen star, personified as a woman named Yvaine. He uses a magic chain to claim her and take her to Victoria.

Three ancient witch sisters resolve to eat the fallen star's heart to recover their youth and replenish their powers. Their leader, Lamia, eats the remnants of an earlier star's heart and departs to find Yvaine. She conjures up a wayside inn as a trap.

Yvaine becomes tired, so Tristan chains her to a tree and promises to bring food. In his absence, a unicorn releases her but unwittingly takes her to Lamia's inn. Tristan finds Yvaine gone, but the stars whisper that she is in danger, explaining how Lamia and her sisters manipulated and killed the last star who fell. The stars tell him to get on a passing coach, which happens to be Primus's. They stop at the inn, interrupting Lamia's attempt to kill Yvaine. Lamia kills Primus, while Tristan and Yvaine use the Babylon candle to escape into the clouds, where they are captured by pirates in a flying ship. The leader, Captain Shakespeare, tells his crew that Tristan is his nephew and Yvaine is a friend. He gives them new clothes and teaches Tristan how to fence.

Septimus, the last surviving son, needs only to find the stone to claim the throne. He learns that Yvaine has it and realizes that her heart grants immortality, which would make him king for eternity.

After leaving Captain Shakespeare, Tristan and Yvaine confess their love for one another and spend the night together at an inn. The next morning, Tristan leaves the sleeping Yvaine and leaves with a lock of her hair to tell Victoria that he has fallen in love with Yvaine. When the lock turns to star dust, he realizes that Yvaine will die if she crosses the wall, and rushes back to save her.

Yvaine finds Tristan gone and, thinking that he has abandoned her for Victoria, despondently walks toward the wall. Noticing Yvaine, Una takes the reins of Ditchwater Sal's caravan and stops her. Lamia kills Sal and captures Una and Yvaine, taking them to the witches' manor. Septimus and Tristan pursue Lamia, agreeing to work together. Barging into the castle, Septimus recognizes Una as his long-lost sister, and Una tells Tristan that she is his mother.

Septimus and Tristan kill Lamia's sisters, but Lamia uses a voodoo doll to kill Septimus. Lamia prepares to kill Tristan when she seemingly breaks down over the loss of her sisters. Lamia frees Yvaine, but her feigned defeat is a ruse, and she tries to kill both. As Tristan and Yvaine embrace, their love allows her to shine once again, killing Lamia.

Tristan retrieves Yvaine's gem, and Una reveals that, as her son, Tristan is the last male heir of Stormhold. He becomes king with Yvaine as his queen, and Dunstan and Una are reunited. Since Tristan has Yvaine's love, he metaphorically has her heart and gains eternal youth. After eighty years of rule, they use a Babylon candle to ascend to the sky, where they live together as stars.

== Cast ==
- Claire Danes as Yvaine, the fallen star
- Charlie Cox as Tristan Thorn
- Sienna Miller as Victoria Forester
- Ricky Gervais as Ferdinand "Ferdy" the fence
- Jason Flemyng as Prince Primus
- Mark Strong as Prince Septimus
- Rupert Everett as Prince Secundus
- Peter O'Toole as the dying King of Stormhold
- Michelle Pfeiffer as Lamia
- Robert De Niro as Captain Shakespeare of the Caspartine
- Sarah Alexander as Empusa, Lamia's sister
- Melanie Hill as Ditchwater Sal
- Joanna Scanlan as Mormo, Lamia's other sister
- Kate Magowan as Princess Una
- David Kelly as the wall guard
- Nathaniel Parker as Dunstan Thorn
  - Ben Barnes as young Dunstan Thorn
- Dexter Fletcher as the skinny pirate
- Henry Cavill as Humphrey, Victoria's boyfriend
- David Walliams as the ghost of Prince Sextus
- Mark Heap as Prince Tertius
- Mark Williams as Billy, a goat converted into human form
- Ian McKellen as the narrator
- Struan Rodger as the bishop
- Julian Rhind-Tutt as the ghost of Prince Quartus
- Adam Buxton as the ghost of Prince Quintus
- George Innes as the soothsayer
- Jake Curran as Bernard
  - Olivia Grant as Bernard's female form
- Coco Sumner as Ingrid, Yvaine's sister
- Mark Burns as the new bishop

== Production ==
=== Development ===
The illustrated fantasy story Stardust was created by Neil Gaiman, with art by Charles Vess. It was first published by DC Comics in 1997 as a prestige format four-issue comic mini-series. Encouraged by publisher Avon, Gaiman decided to adapt Stardust, and in 1999, it was republished as a conventional novel in hardback without illustrations. Gaiman has compared the story to a fantasy version of the 1934 romantic comedy film It Happened One Night.

In 1998, Stardust was optioned for a film adaptation by Bob Weinstein at Miramax. Gaiman wrote a treatment, and then Ehren Kruger wrote a treatment. Gaiman described the process as "an unsatisfactory development period", and he recovered the rights after they expired. For years, Gaiman refused offers to develop the film. Having seen the disappointing results of the hands-off approach taken by Alan Moore, Gaiman preferred to retain control and influence the development of the film.

Eventually, discussions about a film version of Stardust took place between Gaiman, director Terry Gilliam, and producer Matthew Vaughn. Gilliam dropped out following his involvement with The Brothers Grimm and not wanting to do another fairy tale. Vaughn left to produce Layer Cake but then became the director for the first time for that project. After Vaughn withdrew from helming the film X-Men: The Last Stand, talks resumed, and in January 2005, Vaughn acquired the option to develop Stardust. In October 2005, the director entered final negotiations with Paramount Pictures to write, direct, and produce Stardust with a budget estimated at $70–88.5 million. Vaughn said half the financing for the film was British.

=== Adaptation ===
The adapted screenplay was written by Vaughn and screenwriter Jane Goldman, who had been recommended by Gaiman. When asked how the book inspired his vision for the film, Vaughn said that he wanted "to do Princess Bride with a Midnight Run overtone". One of the difficulties with adapting the novel was its earnest and dark nature: an adult fairy tale in which sex and violence are presented unflinchingly. With Gaiman's blessing given to the screenwriters, the movie version has a greater element of whimsy and humor. Gaiman did not want people to go to the theatre to see a film that attempted but failed to be completely loyal to the book. After creating the audiobook version of the novel, Gaiman realized that there were 10½ hours of material in the book. This led him to acknowledge that the film would have to compress the novel, leaving out portions of the work. Budgetary concerns also factored into the adaptation, even with the level of 2006 technology. Gaiman understood the need to move the plot along faster: "In the book, Tristan crosses the wall, meets a strange creature, goes through the wood of vampire trees, and, as his reward, gets the Babylon candle. Now we skip that. He gets the candle, and just lights it, and gets to Yvaine earlier. Otherwise, that would take an hour." Also, the newly created character of Ferdy the Fence was used to push people together faster. Vaughn acknowledges the changes from the book were substantial. The character of Captain Shakespeare was expanded extensively from the novel, where Captain Alberic is only briefly mentioned, and the last half hour of the film is almost entirely different from the book.

Vaughn and Goldman decided that the witches needed names, as in the book, they were collectively the Lilim. They chose names from classical sources that coincidentally included names found in Gaiman's The Books of Magic (Empusa) and Neverwhere (Lamia).

On the film's differences from the novel, Gaiman commented, "I sort of feel like my grounding in comics was actually very useful because, in my head, that's just the Earth-Two version of Stardust. It's a parallel Earth version of Stardust, which has Robert De Niro and stuff. And I get people who come to the book from having loved the movie who are really disappointed at some of the stuff that isn't there that Matthew brought". Responding to a fan's statement about preferring the film's climax compared to the book, Gaiman clarified that he in fact had suggested the different ending that the film ended up using and liked it better for the film but liked the book ending better for the book.

=== Casting ===
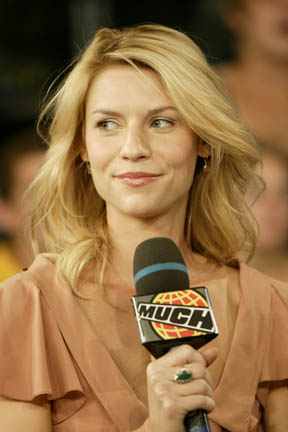
Claire Danes promoting Stardust

In March 2006, the studio cast Robert De Niro, Michelle Pfeiffer, Claire Danes, Charlie Cox, and Sienna Miller. Production began in the United Kingdom and Iceland in April 2006, with the majority of filming taking place in the UK. Vaughn picked Danes, Cox, and Pfeiffer for their roles. He intended Captain Shakespeare to be played by either De Niro or Jack Nicholson. Stephen Fry was pitched as a possible Shakespeare, but Vaughn eventually picked De Niro.

Vaughn insisted on an unknown actor for the part of Tristan. Cox was tentatively cast as Tristan, but to ensure the leads had chemistry on screen, Vaughn would not confirm the casting until both leads were cast. Vaughn had Cox audition alongside the prospective leading actresses until the female lead was cast. Cox had worked alongside Miller before, and played a small supporting as her brother in the 2005 film Casanova.

Sarah Michelle Gellar was offered the role of Yvaine but turned it down, not wanting to be apart from husband Freddie Prinze Jr. while he was filming in the U.S.

The role of Quintus was originally given to comedian Noel Fielding, but due to health issues he had to drop out and was replaced by another comedian Adam Buxton.

=== Filming ===
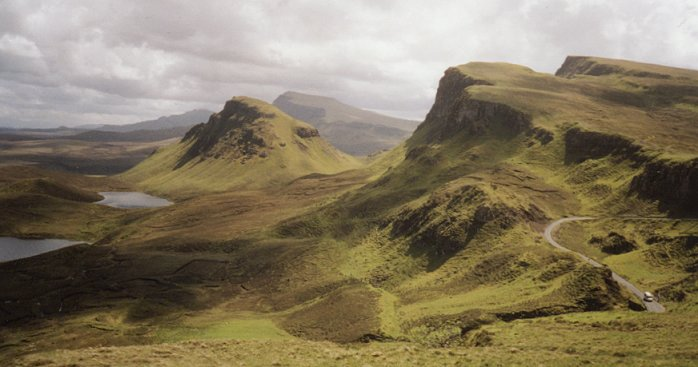
Locations used in Scotland included the area surrounding the Quiraing, on the Isle of Skye.

The production started filming in mid-April 2006, with principal photography taking place at Pinewood Studios in London. Location filming started in Wester Ross, in the Scottish Highlands followed immediately by filming on the Isle of Skye. The scene where Prince Septimus consults the soothsayer was shot in Iceland. The filmmakers had wanted to use more locations in Iceland but were unable to get the horses they needed.

Several weeks of location filming also took place in the woods and the Golden Valley near Little Gaddesden, Hertfordshire, in June and July. In mid-2006, there was some filming at Stowe School in Buckinghamshire and in the village of Castle Combe, Wiltshire. Some of the scenes requiring wide open spaces for riding and coach scenes were filmed at Bicester Airfield in Oxfordshire.

Another film location was on Elm Hill in Norwich. The area, with a mixture of Tudor and medieval buildings dating as far back as the 11th century, was transformed into the streets of Stormhold. The Briton's Arms tea house became the Slaughtered Prince public house. The owners were so enthralled with the new look, including a spectacular mural and new thatching, that they appealed to the local council and English Heritage to keep it, but their request was refused. Filming also took place in Wales, at the Brecon Beacons National Park.

The design of the witches' lair was inspired by the Hall of Mirrors in the Palace of Versailles in France, but with black instead of white and silver instead of gold.

Filming was finished by 13 July 2006.

=== Visual effects ===
The film required 830 visual effects (VFX) shots, which were supervised by Peter Chiang and produced by Tim Field. Double Negative supervised 350 shots, and other work was shared among six other companies, including LipSync Post, Cinesite, The Senate, Baseblack, Machine, and Rushes. Mattes & Miniatures provided miniatures. The pirate skyship set was shot against a 360-degree greenscreen and required fully computer generated backgrounds and digitally extending the size and the bow of the ship. Some distance shots of the ship were entirely computer generated. Yvaine required a star glow effect for more than eighty shots. Two of the witches required a signature magical effect, Lamia had a green fire effect created using a combination of particle animation and joint-driven soft body ribbons, and Sal had a black smoke effect, created by turning animated geometry into a target-driven fluid simulation. The age transformation of Lamia was achieved using a composite of multiple motion control plates, including a pass in the full prosthetic makeup, the transformed youthful Lamia, and a pass where the hair was pulled through a dummy head, played in reverse to give the appearance of hair growing, composited and blended with a procedural glow effect. Twenty feet of The Wall was built on location as a practical effect and extended into the distance using digital painting. VFX was completed by February 2007.

=== Music ===
The film score was composed by Ilan Eshkeri, who previously worked with Vaughn on Layer Cake. Eshkeri was given the script before production began and wrote the first pieces of music inspired by the illustrations of Charles Vess from the graphic novel. Eshkeri was also on set during some of the filming. The score was released by Decca Records on 11 September 2007. Eshkeri won the award for Best New Composer of 2007 from the International Film Music Critics Association, and the score was also nominated in the category Best Original Fantasy Score.

- After watching an early cut, British pop band Take That wrote and recorded a song for the film titled "Rule the World", featuring Gary Barlow on lead vocals. The song features in the end credits to the film and was released as a single on 22 October 2007 in the United Kingdom and peaked at number two on the UK Singles Chart.
- Dimmu Borgir's song "Eradication Instincts Defined" is featured in both the UK and US trailers.
- Prelude 2 in C Minor from the first book of the "Well-Tempered Clavier" by Johann Sebastian Bach was adapted for use in the first part of the scene at Lamia's Inn.
- Slavonic Dances, Op. 46, No. 6 in D Major by Antonín Dvořák was adapted for use in the dancing scene aboard the flying ship.
- "The Infernal Galop" from Jacques Offenbach's "Orpheus in the Underworld", more commonly known as the "Can-can", plays during the fight between Captain Shakespeare's men and Septimus's men on board the sky vessel.

== Release ==
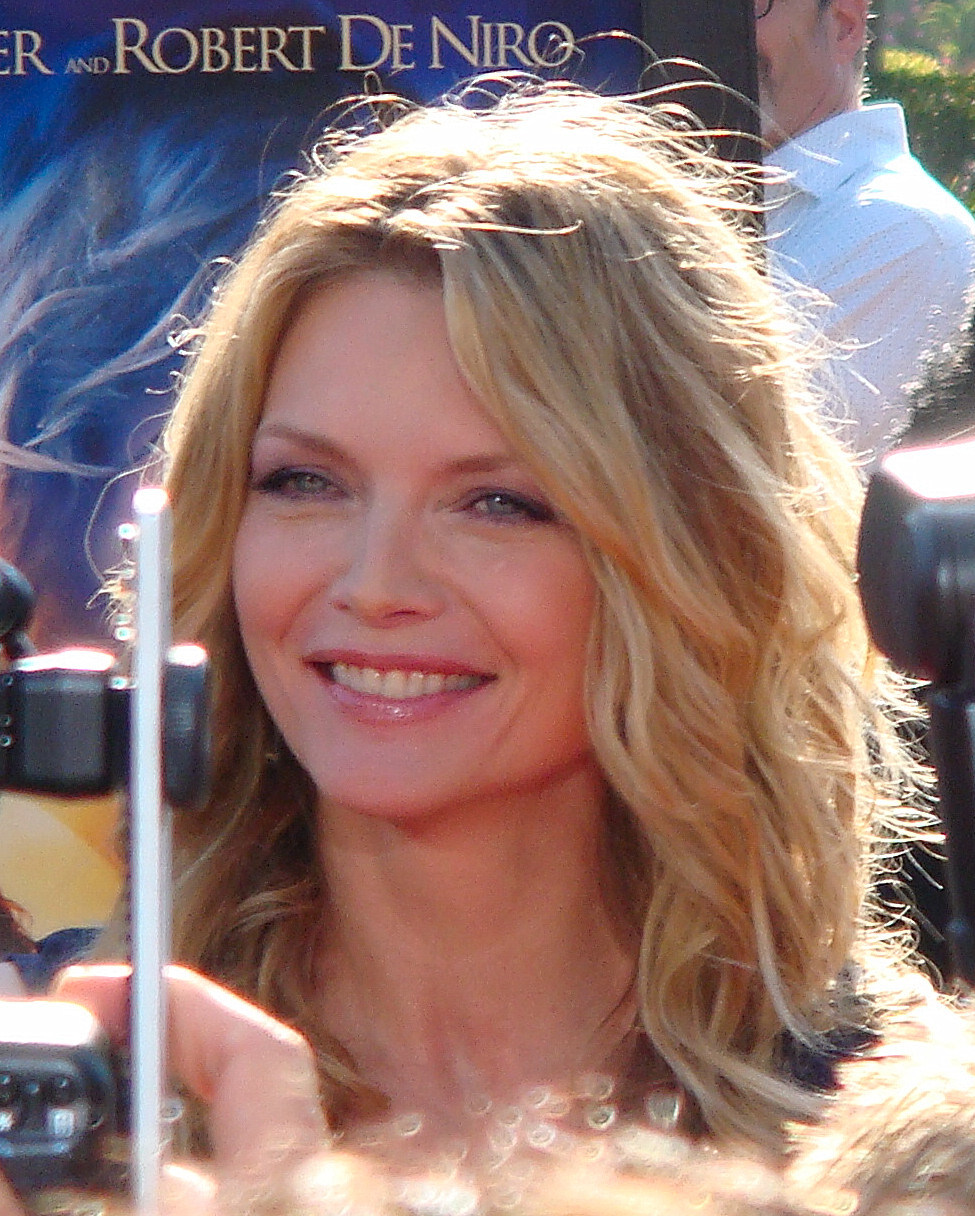
Michelle Pfeiffer at the Los Angeles Premiere of Stardust at Paramount Studios.

=== Pre-release ===
Stardust was well received by test audiences. Producer Lorenzo di Bonaventura was surprised when the film was well received across all demographics, despite the film not having been designed for everyone, expecting instead for parts of the audience to feel the film was not for them. In their feedback, audiences agreed it was not a fairy tale, giving various descriptions of it, such as an adventure with magical elements. A March release had been planned but when Paramount saw its commercial potential it was pushed back to a later date.

=== Box office ===
Stardust premiered at the Paramount Studio Theatre in Los Angeles on 29 July 2007. The film was later released on 10 August 2007 in the United States. It opened in 2,540 theatres, earning US$9,169,779, an average of $3,610 per theatre, putting it in 4th place, with Rush Hour 3 taking 1st. The film also opened the same day in Russia and the rest of the Commonwealth of Independent States, earning $8,118,263 as of 14 October 2007. In the UK and Ireland, the film was released on 19 October 2007, it came in second at the box office in its opening weekend and spent 8 weeks in the box office top ten. Stardust was blocked from release in China due to additional restrictions on foreign films on top of the existing quota system limiting non-Chinese films.

Stardust earned a total of $137,022,245 worldwide. Its biggest markets were the United States, where it made $38 million, and the UK, where it made $31 million (approximately £19.5 million).

== Reception ==
=== Critical reception ===
Stardust received mostly positive reviews from critics. On the review aggregator website Rotten Tomatoes, 77% of 197 critics' reviews are positive, with an average rating of 6.8/10. The website's consensus reads: "A faithful interpretation that captures the spirit of whimsy, action, and off-kilter humor of Neil Gaiman, Stardust juggles multiple genres and tones to create a fantastical experience." Metacritic, which uses a weighted average, assigned the film a score of 66 out of 100, based on 33 critics, indicating "generally favorable" reviews. Audiences surveyed by CinemaScore gave the film a grade "A−" on scale of A to F.

Roger Ebert called it a "fun" movie and gave it a rating of 2.5 out of 4. He criticized the pacing as cluttered and unfocused, and concluded: "It's a film you enjoy in pieces, but the jigsaw never gets solved." The New Yorker's Bruce Diones called it "more surprising and effective than the usual kiddie-matinée madness." John Anderson of Variety wrote: "Sprinkled with tongue-in-cheek humor, fairly adult jokes and some well-known faces acting very silly, this adventure story should have particular appeal to fans of The Princess Bride, but in any event will never be mistaken for a strictly-for-kids movie." Anderson praised Pfeiffer for her comedic timing and called De Niro's performance "as engrossing as a car crash". He says the romance is the least interesting part of the film, but the sweep of the story and the humor keep the film together. Stephen Holden of The New York Times wrote: "Michelle Pfeiffer is Lamia, as deliciously evil a witch as the movies have ever invented" and suggested she should be the center of the film. Holden said that Danes was miscast, and described De Niro's performance as "either a piece of inspired madcap fun or an excruciating embarrassment." Kurt Loder of MTV News was critical of De Niro's performance saying "This could be the most pointlessly grotesque performance of De Niro's career; it's flabbergastingly unfunny." Michael Dwyer of The Irish Times described the film as "diverting in its whimsical way, but burdened with non-sequiturs, and it ought to have been subjected to more rigorous pruning in the editing suite". Dwyer criticized the cameos of Gervais and De Niro as unsubtle, jarring, and self-indulgent, and said Danes was miscast. He praised Pfeiffer, saying she gave the film "the kiss of life". Dan Jolin of Empire called it "Patchy but great fun, peppering plenty of black humour into a sweet if silly fairy-tale romance." Glenn Kenny of Premiere called it "an eye-poppingly elaborate fantasy that's shot through with action-movie adrenaline and attitude." Time Out London compared the film to Time Bandits or The Princess Bride "but it lacks the former's originality and the latter's heart". Tim Robey of The Telegraph wrote: "There's a shameless romantic streak here, quite welcome in a boy-targeted genre that usually insists battles are cool and love is for wimps."

Philip French of The Observer said the film "fails on every level" and referring to a scene with Robert De Niro said it "plumbs new depths of camp embarrassment". Deborah Ross of The Spectator called the film "a grindingly familiar huge pile of nothing which may please six-year-olds and fantasy nerds, but that's about it".

=== Accolades ===
Associated Press Film critic David Germain put the film in 7th place on his list of the 10 best films of 2007. "Rule the World" was also submitted for consideration at the 80th Academy Awards for Best Original Song but was not nominated.

Award	Category	Recipient	Result
34th Annual Saturn Awards 2008	Best Fantasy Film	Stardust	Nominated
34th Annual Saturn Awards 2008	Best Supporting Actress	Michelle Pfeiffer	Nominated
34th Annual Saturn Awards 2008	Best Costume	Sammy Sheldon	Nominated
Empire Awards 2008	Best Sci-Fi/Fantasy	Stardust	Won
GLAAD Media Awards 2008	Outstanding Film - Wide Release	Stardust	Won
Hugo Awards 2008	Best Dramatic Presentation - Long Form	Jane Goldman (written by), Matthew Vaughn (written by/director), Neil Gaiman (based on the novel by), Charles Vess (illustrated by)	Won
Phoenix Film Critics Society Awards 2007	Overlooked Film of the Year	Stardust	Won

== Home media ==
The film was released on both Region 1 DVD and HD DVD on 18 December 2007. The DVD was released in both Fullscreen and Widescreen aspect ratios. The HD DVD and DVD special features include a documentary entitled Good Omens: The Making of Stardust; deleted scenes from the film; the film's blooper reel; and the film's theatrical trailer.

The film and special features on the HD DVD version are presented in 2.35:1 widescreen high definition 1080p and feature a Dolby Digital Plus 5.1 audio soundtrack.

The film was released on Region A Blu-ray Disc (Canada and the US) on 7 September 2010.

== Legacy ==
Vaughn had ideas for Stardust 2 that would involve London in the 1960s, but the first film was not financially successful enough to justify a sequel.

On the 10th Anniversary of the film's release Vanity Fair interviewed Charlie Cox, who is frequently recognized by fans for the role early in his career. Cox said that he was unsure why the film is so popular but noted that Vaughn wanted to make a film with broad appeal, while Goldman avoided extraneous detail and focused on the heart of the story. Vanity Fair noted that the film gets replayed frequently in syndication and describes it as "endlessly likable", with a great cast, special effects that are not too dated, and "the best adaptation of Gaiman's work, capturing his unique blend of darkness and whimsy perfectly."

Vaughn was critical of the marketing of the film, saying it had been promoted as if it were Lord of the Rings when it had been much more influenced by The Princess Bride. He noted that although the film did not do well in cinemas, it became an "evergreen title" on DVD.
