= The Briton's Arms =

Historic building in Norwich, England

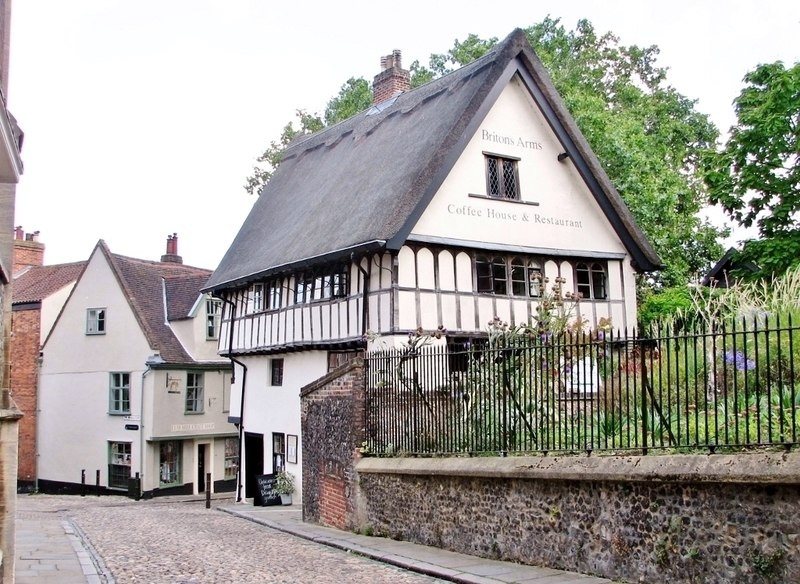
- The Briton's Arms, now a restaurant, in 2019. The churchyard of St Peter Hungate (right) borders the building.
- Interactive map of the The Briton's Arms area

General information
- Type: Public house
- Location: 9 Elm Hill, Norwich, England
- Coordinates: 52.63128°N 1.29669°E

Technical details
- Structural system: Timber framing

Design and construction
- Designations

Listed Building – Grade II*
- Official name: The Briton's Arms, 9, Elm Hill
- Designated: 26 February 1954
- Reference no.: 1372804

Website
- britonsarms.com

The Briton's Arms is a Grade II* listed restaurant at 9 Elm Hill, Norwich in England. Located directly next to the churchyard of St Peter Hungate, it may have been a beguinage. It was constructed from the early 15th century, featuring a timber frame and thatched roof. It is reputed to be the only building on Elm Hill to survive a fire in 1507. It is Norwich's only former dwelling house below the level of its urban elite that can be dated to before the 1507 fires, and may be the only surviving example in England of a purpose-built beguinage. It became a public house in the 19th century, then a café and restaurant. It was used for the 2007 film Stardust.

== History ==
The building's fabric dates to the early 15th century and later. Antiquarian Francis Blomefield referred to a beguinage on the north-west side of the church of St Peter Hungate, though did not give a source for this information. He wrote:

The house at the north-west corner of the churchyard [...] was anciently inhabited by women who dwelt together there under a religious vow and were called the sisters of St. Peter, sometimes the sisters at Houndgate, and sometimes the widows there.

This beguinage, founded by the English merchant John Asger, purportedly resided in this building. The building is reputed to be the only house on Elm Hill to survive destruction by fire in 1507.

From the 19th century, the building became a public house known as the Briton's Arms. It became a Grade II* listed building in 1954. The building is now a café and restaurant of the same name. The building was used for the 2007 film Stardust, appearing as the Slaughtered Prince hostelry.

== Architecture ==
The Briton's Arms is not a typical medieval domestic structure. The building is of three storeys, as well as a cellar. It has a flint and brick rubble ground floor and rear walls, as well as rendered timber frame. Dendrochronological analysis of various timbers in the building has determined that these date to between the years 1188 and 1406, were cut between 1407–20, and are imports from the Baltic region. While timber-framed superstructures with flint and brick rubble foundations like that in the Briton's Arms were also being used in 15th-century mercantile properties, after the 1507 fire, this method was adopted as the typical mode of building in Norwich.

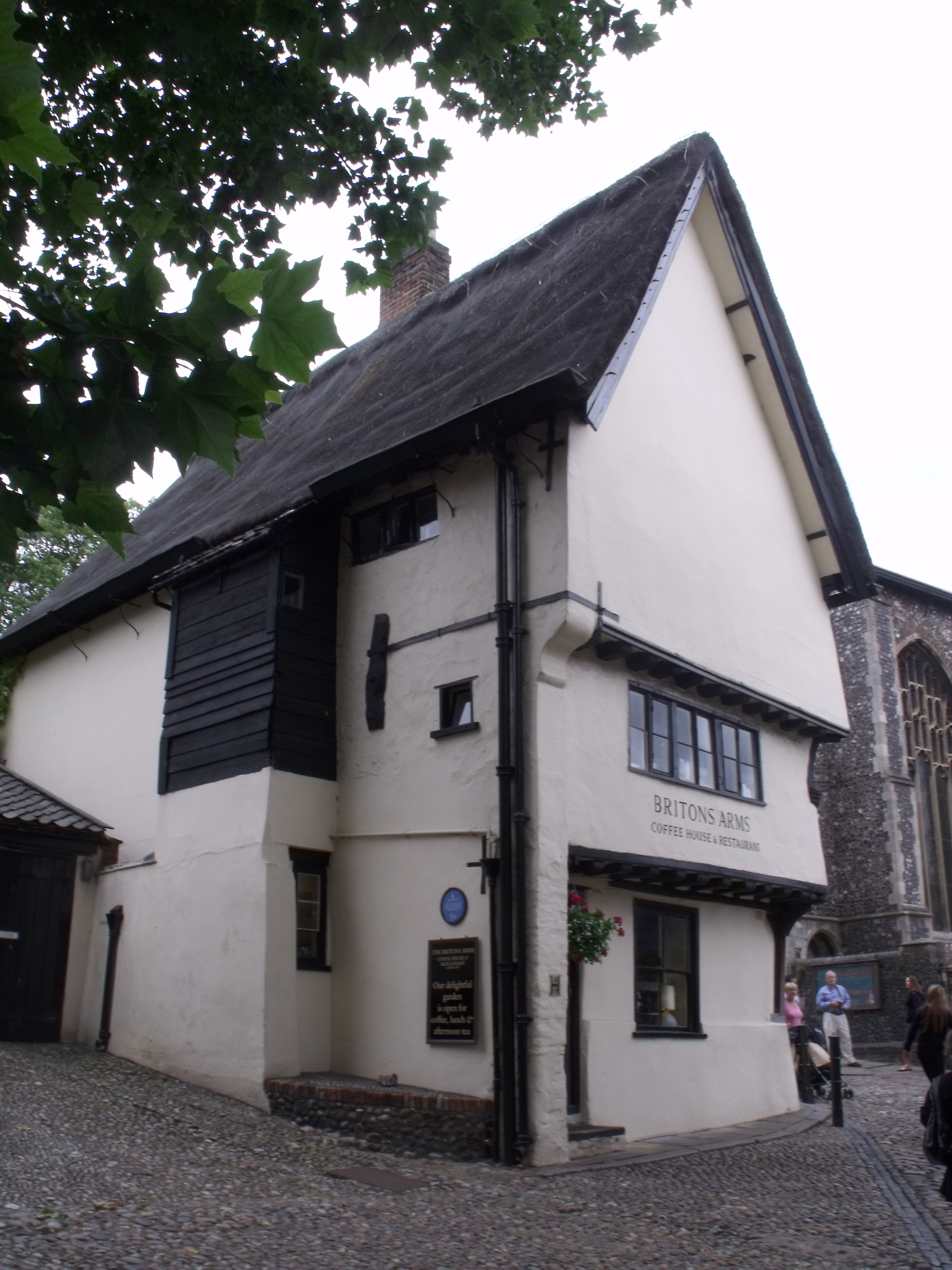
Rear of the building in 2011

On the ground floor, there is one bay to the gable front. It has a high rendered plinth, with a single step up to a 19th-century half-glazed door. There is a single 19th-century ground-floor window with large panes. There are bracketed first-floor jetties. On the first floor, there is a mullioned first-floor six-light casement window. On the side elevation on this floor there are scattered windows, including three further mullioned casement windows including one with leaded lights. The second floor is arcaded; after this was discovered during renovations, it was decided that these should be left exposed on the west and south elevations. There is only a second-floor jetty on the right side elevation. The building has an attic.

The interior of the building has a door with two-centred head, and there are fireplaces on all floors. The building has a brick ridge-chimney on a clasped purlin thatched roof, which has plain bargeboards. This type of roof framing would become common in the 16th century.

== Sources ==
- King, Chris (15 October 2020). Houses and Society in Norwich, 1350–1660: Urban Buildings in an Age of Transition (1st ed.). Edinburgh University Press. doi:10.1017/9781787449329. ISBN 9781787449329.
