= Elm Hill, Norwich =

Historic cobbled lane in Norwich, England

Elm Hill
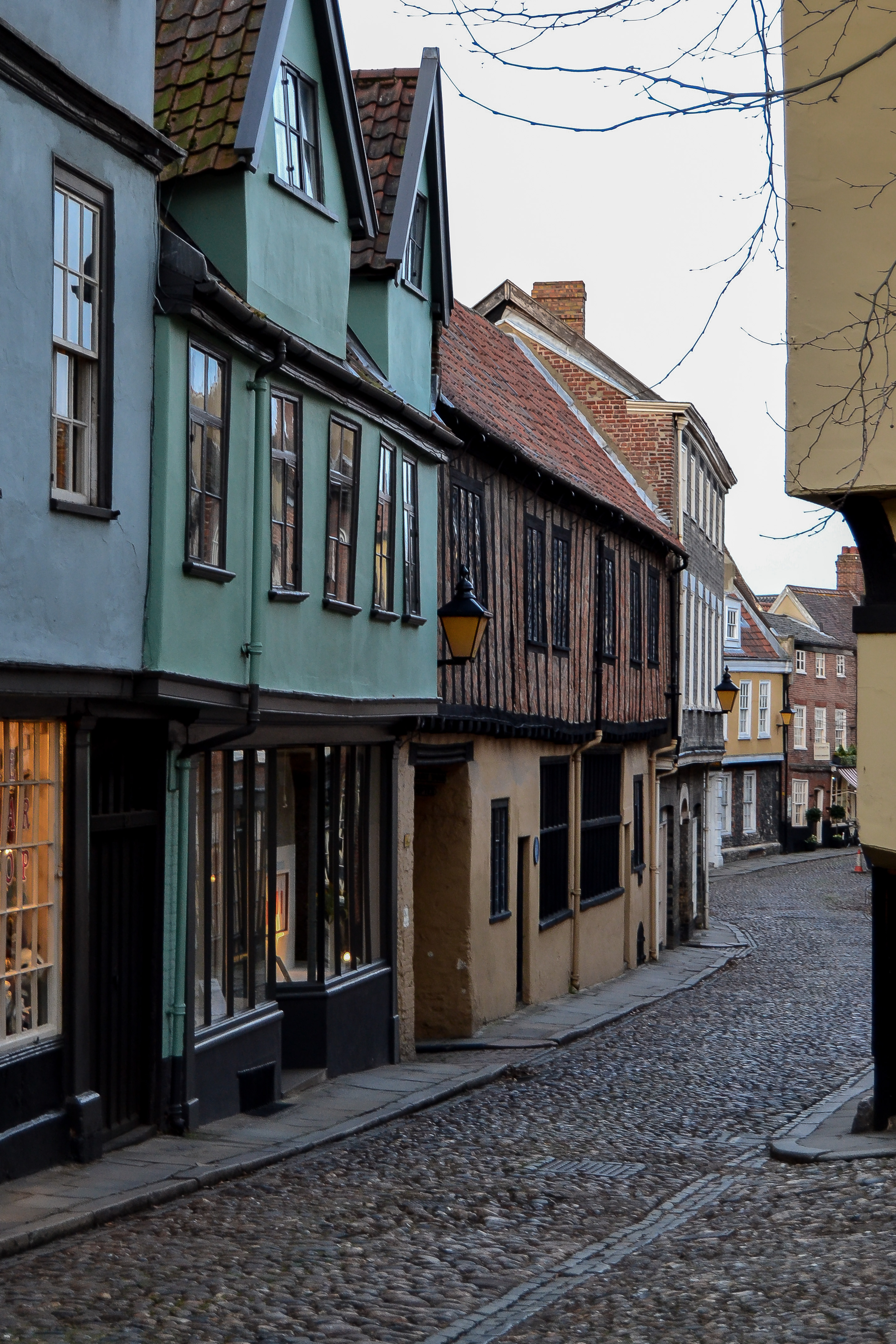
- Elm Hill in 2018, looking east

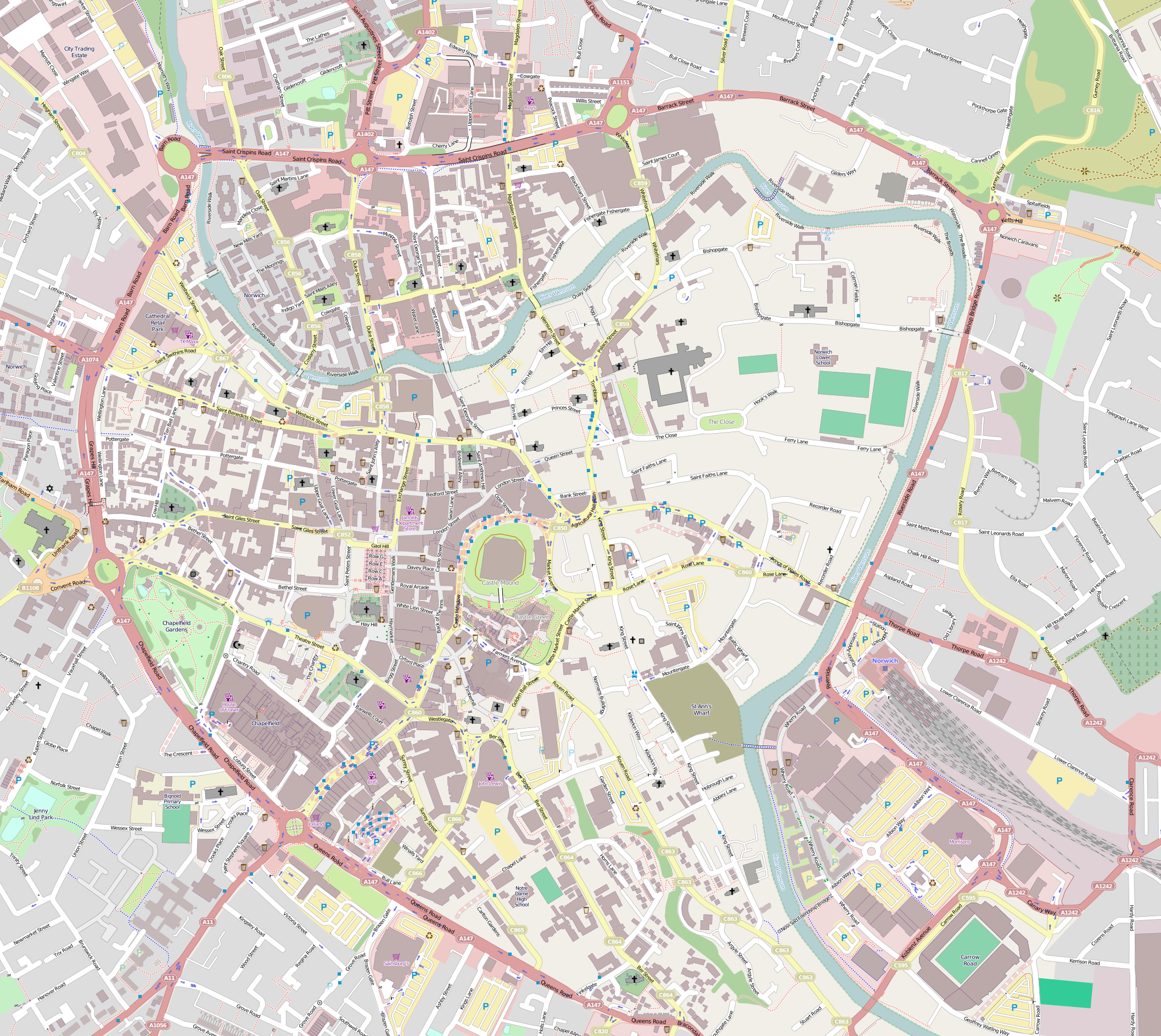
- Location within Norwich
- Maintained by: Norwich City Council
- Coordinates: 52°37′54.4″N 1°17′49.6″E

Elm Hill, Norwich is a historic cobbled lane in Norwich, Norfolk with many buildings dating back to the Tudor period. It is a famous Norwich landmark and features the Briton's Arms coffee house, The Stranger's Club, Pettus House (Elm Hill Collectables), The Tea House (in Wrights Court) and the Dormouse Bookshop.

It has been used as a location for television and film productions, most notably for the 2007 film Stardust and also Netflix's 2020 film Jingle Jangle.

== History ==
=== Toponymy ===
Elm Hill acquired its name from the elm trees that have successively stood in the square since the first quarter of the 16th century when the Churchwardens of St Peter Hungate Church planted the first one. (The tree you see today is not an elm because of the presence of Dutch elm disease in the UK). The parish pump, though not the original, is sited near the tree.

=== First mention ===
There is no record of the date when Elm Hill first came into being, but there is some evidence for its existence around 1200. Very few buildings now standing in Elm Hill are of an earlier date than 1507, when a disastrous fire destroyed over 700 houses in Norwich. The Britons Arms was the only building to survive, so is much older.

Elm Hill used to continue in a straight line past Britons Arms and intersect with St Georges Street but was re-aligned in the 15th century to permit the construction of St Andrew's & Blackfriars Halls which were originally the home of the Dominican friars. Elm Hill today extends from the Church of St. Peter Hungate where the top of Elm Hill meets Princes Street, to the Church of St. Simon and St. Jude, sited at the bottom of Elm Hill on the corner with Wensum Street.

Although it may not be immediately apparent today, the North side of Elm Hill runs parallel to the river Wensum and in the past many of the merchant houses had their own quays. During the 15th and 16th centuries Elm Hill and the river were important commercial thoroughfares. The river was the route from which raw materials were imported and finished products exported via Great Yarmouth. At this time there was industrial prosperity in Norwich due largely to the arrival of religious refugees from Europe and the settlement of a large number of weavers, dyers, goldsmiths and other skilled craftsmen.

Many wealthy merchants had their houses facing Elm Hill with their factories and workshops at the rear. Between them and the river were the homes of their workpeople. Elm Hill has provided sixteen recorded citizens to serve Norwich as Mayor or Sheriff.

=== Potential demolition in 1926 ===
With the gradual decline of Norwich as a centre of the weaving industry in the 19th century, Elm Hill lost its importance and slowly degenerated into a slum area. By 1926 where once stood the fine houses of the merchants there was only neglect and decay. The areas leading down to the river, whilst still inhabited, were scenes of poverty and squalor. The Norwich Corporation wanted to demolish and build a swimming pool on the north side of the street but at the last moment was persuaded to adopt the ideas from the Norwich Society.

In 1927 the Norwich Society, carried out a detailed survey and report on Elm Hill, forwarding this, with their recommendations, to the Norwich Corporation for their consideration. The report made it clear that despite the shocking condition of the Elm Hill area there still remained much of historic and architectural value and that with a general clearance of the slums, and sympathetic renovation of some of the more important buildings, it could once again become an important area of interest. Renovation work commenced in 1927. The Corporation purchased some of the properties, the slums were largely demolished and further purchases were made after the war. Today, with a few exceptions, Norwich City Council still owns most of the buildings.

=== Norwich keyboard ===
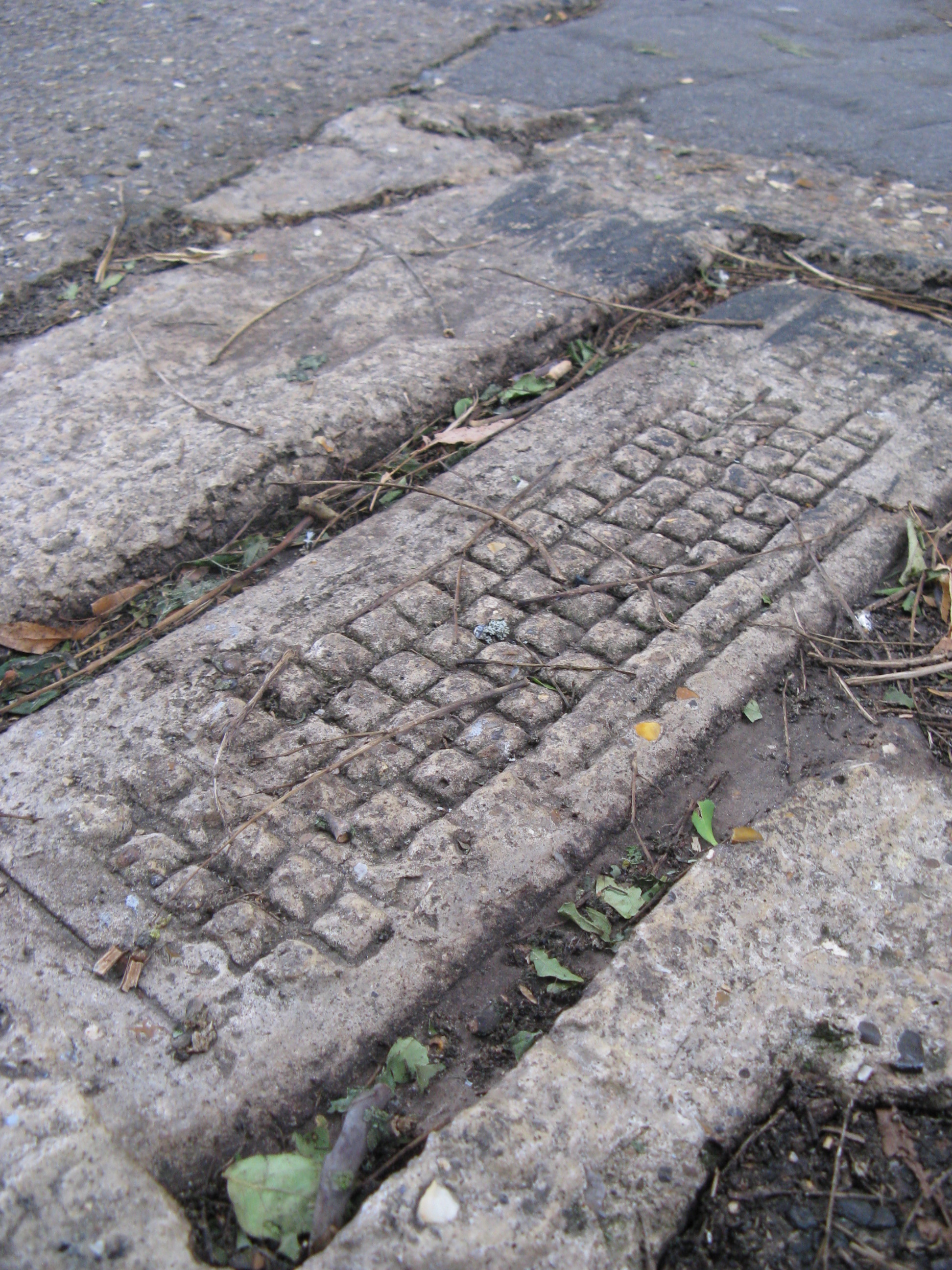
The keyboard artwork in 2010

In 1999, Molly Sole, then a student at the Norwich School of Art and Design, had created a computer keyboard mould as part of an art project. While passing the corner of Princes Street and Elm Hill she saw a fresh patch of laid concrete and on the spur of the moment pressed her keyboard template into the still-wet concrete, creating a "fossilized keyboard". The artwork sparked several urban legends, from being the impression of a keyboard that fell into the fresh cement of the pavement in the 1980s, to being the remains of a typewriter. After years perpetuating as an unsolved mystery for Norwich locals, this story was solved by the YouTuber Nostalgia Nerd in May 2020, and later picked up by the press.

== See also ==
- Jettying
