= Tulsita, Texas =

Census-designated place in Bee County, Texas, United States

- Census-designated place
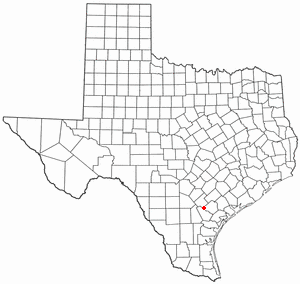
- Location of Tulsita, Texas

- Coordinates: 28°38′38″N 97°49′3″W
- Country: United States
- State: Texas
- County: Bee

Area
  - Total: 0.29 sq mi (0.75 km^{2})
  - Land: 0.29 sq mi (0.75 km^{2})
  - Water: 0 sq mi (0.0 km^{2})
- Elevation: 318 ft (97 m)

Population (2020)
  - Total: 31
  - Density: 110/sq mi (41/km^{2})
- Time zone: UTC-6 (Central (CST))
  - Summer (DST): UTC-5 (CDT)
- Zip Code: 78146
- FIPS code: 48-73904
- GNIS feature ID: 1370201

Tulsita is a census-designated place (CDP) in Bee County, Texas, United States. The population was 31 at the 2020 census.

== Geography ==
Tulsita is located in northern Bee County at 28°38′38″N 97°49′03″W. U.S. Route 181 passes through the community, leading southward 18 miles (29 km) to Beeville, which is the county seat, and northward 12 miles (19 km) to Kenedy.

According to the United States Census Bureau, the CDP has a total area of 0.29 square miles (0.75 km^{2}), all land.

== Demographics ==
Historical population
Census	Pop.	Note	%±
2000	20		—
2010	14		−30.0%
2020	31		121.4%
U.S. Decennial Census; 1850–1900 1910; 1920 1930 1940; 1950 1960 1970; 1980 1990 2000; 2010 2020

Tulsita was first listed as a census designated place in the 2000 U.S. census.

Tulsita CDP, Texas – Racial and ethnic composition Note: the US Census treats Hispanic/Latino as an ethnic category. This table excludes Latinos from the racial categories and assigns them to a separate category. Hispanics/Latinos may be of any race.
Race / Ethnicity (NH = Non-Hispanic)	Pop 2000	Pop 2010	Pop 2020	% 2000	% 2010	% 2020
White alone (NH)	12	13	26	60.00%	92.86%	83.87%
Black or African American alone (NH)	0	0	0	0.00%	0.00%	0.00%
Native American or Alaska Native alone (NH)	0	0	0	0.00%	0.00%	0.00%
Asian alone (NH)	0	0	0	0.00%	0.00%	0.00%
Pacific Islander alone (NH)	0	0	0	0.00%	0.00%	0.00%
Other race alone (NH)	0	0	0	0.00%	0.00%	0.00%
Mixed race or Multiracial (NH)	0	0	2	0.00%	0.00%	6.45%
Hispanic or Latino (any race)	8	1	3	40.00%	7.14%	9.68%
Total	20	14	31	100.00%	100.00%	100.00%

=== 2000 census ===
As of the census of 2000, there were 20 people, 8 households, and 6 families residing in the CDP. The population density was 10.0 people per square mile (3.9/km^{2}). There were 15 housing units at an average density of 7.5/sq mi (2.9/km^{2}). The racial makeup of the CDP was 75.00% White, 20.00% from other races, and 5.00% from two or more races. Hispanic or Latino of any race were 40.00% of the population.

There were 8 households, out of which 37.5% had children under the age of 18 living with them, 37.5% were married couples living together, 25.0% had a female householder with no husband present, and 25.0% were non-families. 12.5% of all households were made up of individuals, and 12.5% had someone living alone who was 65 years of age or older. The average household size was 2.50 and the average family size was 2.83.

In the CDP, the population was spread out, with 40.0% under the age of 18, 20.0% from 25 to 44, 30.0% from 45 to 64, and 10.0% who were 65 years of age or older. The median age was 34 years. For every 100 females, there were 81.8 males. For every 100 females age 18 and over, there were 71.4 males.

The median income for a household in the CDP was $16,250, and the median income for a family was $23,125. Males had a median income of $24,063 versus $0 for females. The per capita income for the CDP was $7,412. There are 37.5% of families living below the poverty line and 56.0% of the population, including 69.2% of under eighteens and 100.0% of those over 64.

== Education ==
Tulsita is served by the Pettus Independent School District.

== See also ==
- List of census-designated places in Texas
