= Pettus baronets =

Extinct baronetcy in the Baronetage of England

The Pettus Baronetcy of Rackheath in Norfolk, England, was a title in the Baronetage of England. It was created on 23 September in 1641 for Thomas Pettus, the High Sheriff of Norfolk. The sixth Baronet was the High Sheriff of Norfolk in 1746. The title became extinct on his death in 1772.

There are discrepancies in the lineage of the baronetcy due to source documents disagreeing with details in various published accounts. The most notable is the confusion of two related individuals, both called "Sir John Pettus" by ancient chroniclers.

The family played a role in trade and exploration including the settlement of the New World, by founding the East India Company, and by other commercial and military achievements. The family also suffered in the Royal Cause under King Charles I, supporting him with arms, money and military action.

The family is said to have descended from Simon Le Petit, a merchant of Norwich, where he is mentioned on the Patent Rolls:

"1227 A.D. De Licencia per Lewelinum (sic). –Simon le Petit, Mercator L. principis Norwallic, habet licenciam veniendi in Angliam et morandi et redeundi cum vinis et mercandisis suis, faciendo inde rectas et debitas consuetudines. Et durabit usque ad festum Sancti Michaelis anno etc. xj. Test ut supra.".

Translation: "1227 A.D. Licensed by Lewelinum (sic). – The high Norwallic merchant prince Simon le Petit has left to come to England and has brought with him wines and merchandise. He will stay until the feast of St. Michael next year."

The family seat was Rackheath Hall, Rackheath, Norfolk.

== Pettus Baronets of Rackheath Hall, Norfolk (1641–1772) ==
Escutcheon of the Pettus baronets of Rackheath Hall, Norfolk

=== Sir Thomas Pettus, 1st Baronet ===
Sir Thomas Pettus, son to Sir Augustine Pettus (16 July 1582 – 9 July 1613) was the first of the Baronets. He firstly married Elizabeth Knyvett, daughter to Sir Thomas Knyvett of Ashwellthorpe, and secondly, the daughter to and coheiress of Sir Nathaniel Bacon of Stiffkey. Sir Thomas Pettus accompanied King Charles I on his expedition in 1640 into Scotland and Northumberland and may have been granted his Baronetcy as a result. He served as a captain under Colonel Jerom Brett and Lieutenant Colonel Sir Vivian Molineaux. His monument can be found in the St. Simon and St. Jude's Church, Norwich in Norwich.

=== Sir Thomas Pettus, 2nd Baronet ===
Son to Sir Thomas Pettus, 1st Baronet, and Lady Elizabeth Knyvett. The birth-date of Thomas Pettus is unknown. He died on 30 October 1671 at Rackheath, Norfolk, and was buried on 4 November the same year. He married Elizabeth Overbury in 1656, daughter to Walter Overbury, Esq. of Barton-on-the-Heath, Warwickshire, and his wife Magdalen Marsham.

=== Sir John Pettus, 3rd Baronet ===
Son to Sir Thomas Pettus, 2nd Baronet, and Lady Elizabeth Overbury. He was born in 1645, and on 27 May 1670 married at Chiselton, Essex, Mary Burwell (cc.1650 – 1672), daughter to Nicholas Burwell, Esq. of Gray's Inn. His date of death is unknown.

=== Sir Horatio Pettus, 4th Baronet ===
Son to Sir John Pettus, 3rd Baronet and Lady Mary (1672–1731). He married Elizabeth Meers in 1701 at St Giles in the Fields, Middlesex.

=== Sir John Pettus, 5th Baronet ===
Son to Sir Horatio Pettus, 4th Baronet and Lady Elizabeth Meers. He was born on 27 December 1705 at Rackheath, Norfolk. He died on 2 May 1743 at Rackheath.

=== Sir Horatio Pettus, 6th Baronet ===
Second surviving son to Sir Horatio Pettus, 5th Baronet and Lady Elizabeth (1707 – 1772). He married Rebecca Prideaux on 31 December 1744 at the Church of Saint John the Baptist, Maddermarket, Norwich. He was appointed High Sheriff of Norfolk for 1746–47.
