= Curious Directive =

Curious Directive logo

curious directive is a British Theatre company, based in Norwich and led by artistic director and CEO, Jack Lowe. The company is an ensemble of theatre makers and scientists founded in the autumn of 2008 with a production exploring neuroscience, called Return to the Silence.

Their major productions are devised and written by members of the company, dealing with themes of science, and authored by Jack Lowe.

Recent productions have explored astro-biology, the NHS, myrmecology, cognitive neuroscience, light, architecture, genetics, motion and bio-politics.

The company explores life in all its diversity and complexity through the lens of science."

== Awards & Nominations ==
- UK Theatre Awards 2026, Best New play for Black Sheep
- OffWestEnd Award (Offie), nominated 2021 for Best Set and Costume Design for Deciphering
- Scotsman Fringe First Award Winner 2014 for Pioneer
- Scotsman Fringe First Award Winner 2011Your Last Breath

== Productions (2008-) ==
2008-9 - Return to the Silence, a curious directive production. Presented at NSDF, Shunt and The Pleasance (London)

2011 - Your Last Breath, a curious directive production and UK Tour.

2012 - After the Rainfall, a curious directive production in association with Watford Palace Theatre and UK Tour

2013 - Olfactory, a curious directive production, co-commissioned by Lyric Hammersmith, GDIF, Imagine Watford and Latitude Festival and UK tour

2014 - The Kindness of Strangers, a curious directive and Norfolk and Norwich Festival co-production and UK Tour.

2015 - Pioneer, a curious directive and Watford Palace Theatre co-production and UK Tour.

2017 - Frogman - a curious directive and Hull City of Culture co-production in association with Brisbane Powerhouse and the Great Barrier Reef Foundation. Premiere Traverse Theatre. UK Tour and International Tour

2019 - Gastronomic - a curious directive production, co-commissioned by Norwich Theatre Royal and Shoreditch Town Hall. UK tour.

2021 - Deciphering - a curious directive and New Diorama Theatre co-production. UK tour.

2022 - Spindrift - a curious directive production, in association with Theatre Royal Plymouth.

2024 - Black Sheep - a curious directive production, supported by National Theatre Generate Programme. UK tour.

2025 - The Exoplanets - a curious directive and City of London Sinfonia co-production. Supported by NASA's Conceptual Image Laboratory and NSMH. Premiered at Norwich Theatre Royal. Toured to Hackney Empire.

2026 - Heartwood - a curious directive production, co-commissioned by Norfolk and Norwich Festival 2026, New Earth Theatre and NHS Blood and Transplant.

== Reviews ==
- The Kindness of Strangers - review by Lyn Gardner (The Guardian)
- After The Rainfall - review by Laura Barnett (The Telegraph)
- Your Last Breath - review by Lyn Gardner (The Guardian)
