= Stephen P. Read =

American politician

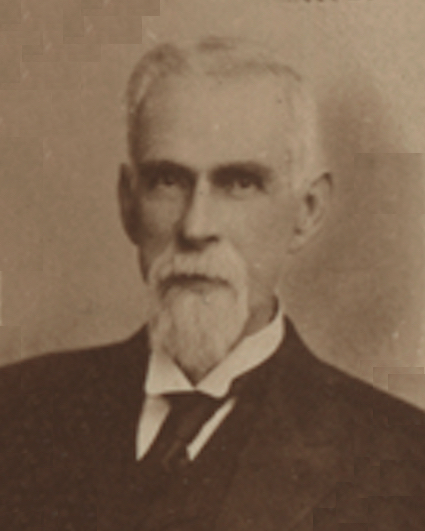

Member of the Virginia House of Delegates from Mecklenburg County
- In office March 1903 – January 12, 1910
- Preceded by: E. Patterson McLean
- Succeeded by: F. B. Roberts

Member of the Virginia Senate from the 25th district
- In office December 2, 1885 – December 4, 1889
- Preceded by: William Townes
- Succeeded by: William H. Woods

Personal details
- Born: Stephen Pettus Read; March 2, 1841
- Died: June 8, 1917 (aged 76)
- Party: Democratic
- Spouse: Mary Wright

Military service
- Allegiance: Confederate States
- Branch/service: Confederate States Army
- Rank: Captain
- Battles/wars: American Civil War

Stephen Pettus Read (March 2, 1841 – June 8, 1917) was an American politician who served in the Virginia Senate and Virginia House of Delegates. He took office after his predecessor, E. Patterson McLean refused to take an oath supporting the 1902 state constitution.
