= John Pettus (MP for Norwich) =

English Member of Parliament

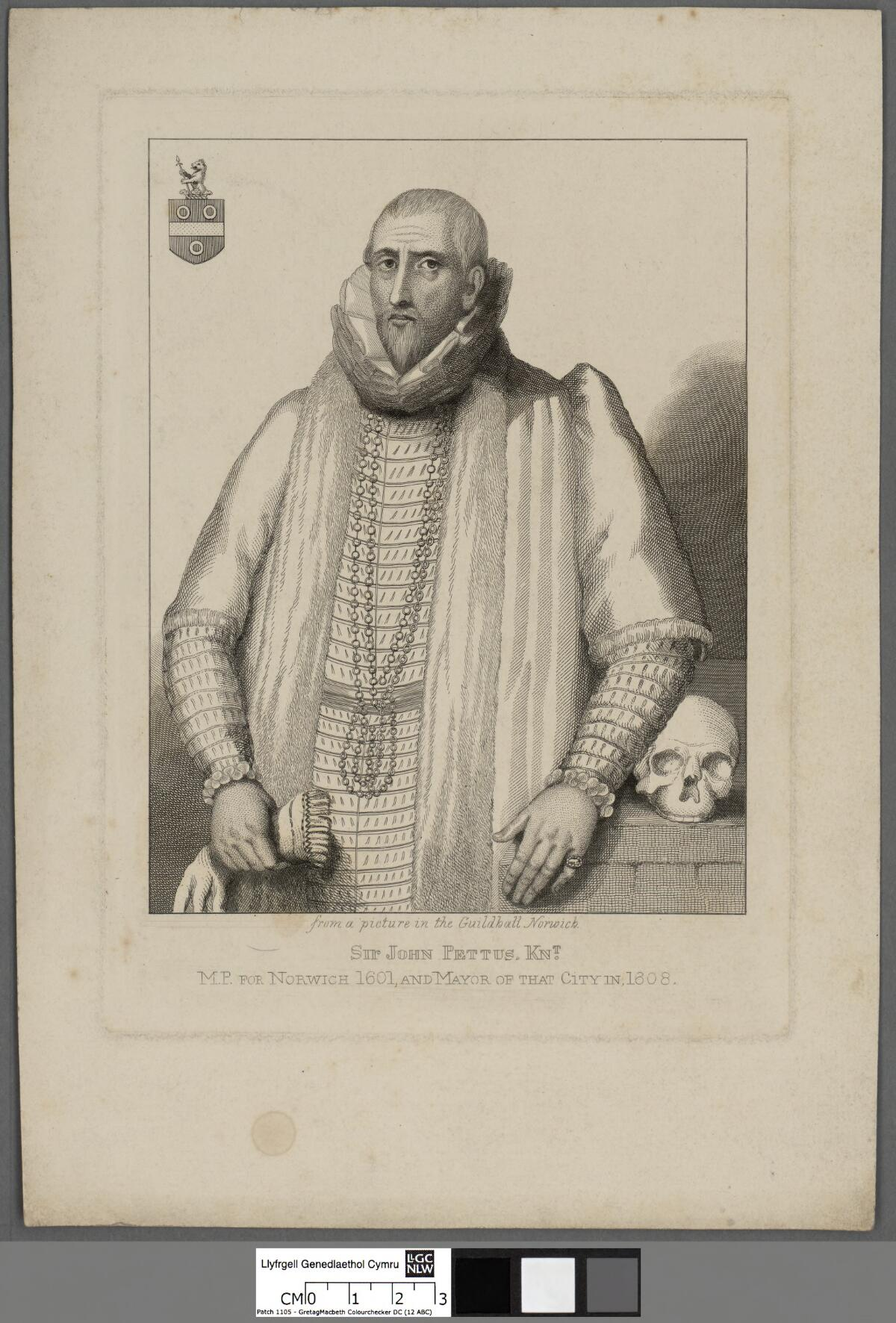
John Pettus (MP for Norwich)

John Pettus (1550–1614), of Elm Street, Norwich, Norfolk, was an English Member of Parliament for Norwich in 1601 and 1604. He was Mayor of Norwich in 1608–9. A monument to John Pettus, alongside his wife Bridget Curtis as well as his two sons and daughter, resides on the north side of the chancel arch at St Simon and St Jude's Church, Norwich.
