= Pettus, West Virginia =

Pettus
- Unincorporated community
- Location within the state of West Virginia Pettus (the United States)
- Coordinates: 37°57′23″N 81°32′15″W
- Country: United States
- State: West Virginia
- County: Raleigh
- Elevation: 860 ft (260 m)
- Time zone: UTC-5 (Eastern (EST))
  - Summer (DST): UTC-4 (EDT)
- GNIS ID: 1544762

Pettus is an unincorporated community in Raleigh County, West Virginia, United States.

The community was named after W. H. Pettus, a businessperson in the coal mining industry.
