= St Peter Hungate =

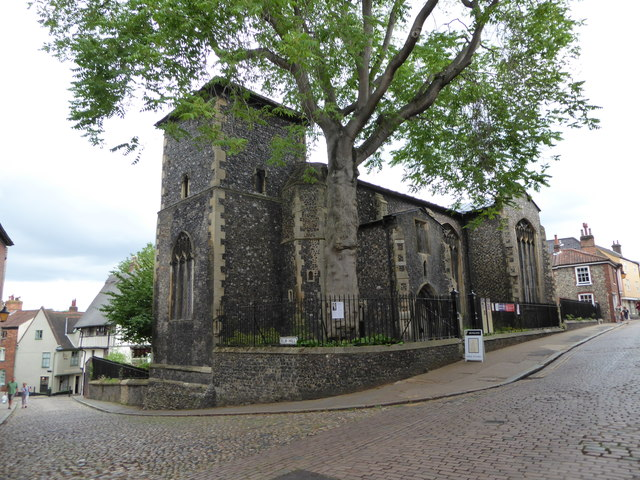
- St Peter Hungate in 2016
- St Peter Hungate
- 52°37′52″N 1°17′49.44″E
- OS grid reference: TG 23210 08803
- Location: Norwich, Norfolk
- Country: England
- Denomination: Church of England
- Website: hungate.org.uk

History
- Dedication: St Peter

Architecture
- Heritage designation: Grade I listed

St Peter Hungate is a Grade I listed redundant parish church in the Church of England in Norwich.

It is dedicated to Saint Peter the Apostle, one of four medieval churches in the city that had this dedication. Its suffix of Hungate is derived from the medieval street name Hundegate, a common street name from the English Danelaw that comes from the word for 'dog' and the word gate, in this case meaning a street or way. Hungate as a term was occasionally used in reference to the general area of the church.

== History ==
Before 1247, the church was undocumented. That year, there was a bequest to an anchorite at St Peter Hungate. At this time, the rectory of the church was likely in private hands, though it is unclear who held the patronage of the church prior to the college of St Mary in the Fields. The church is mentioned in additions to the Valuation of Norwich after 1272, after being unmentioned in the original document; it was likely valued at less than 5 shillings per year. By 1271, the college of St Mary in the Fields held the advowson.

John and Margaret Paston acquired the advowson of the church from St Mary's College in 1458; these parishioners, some of the wealthiest people in the region, rebuilt large sections of the church.

In 1556, a pageant composed by a master of the Norwich School, John Buck, was performed outside the church for the inauguration of a new Mayor of Norwich, Augustine Steward, almost definitely making use of the school's pupils for the performance:

Prouyde for the poore that Impotennte bee
As Charryte maye moue yow theire nede when ye see.
For who so the hungrie and thirstie shall feede
God will rewarde him, seven follde for his deede.
Cause yoothe to be trayned and seasoned in Tyme
In vertew and Labour from synne vice and Cryme.
But when men be Careles and soffer yowthe stylle
They Cyttie ys plaged in wreke of soche eavelle.

John Burges was rector from 1590.

=== 1631–1868: Rectorship of William Bridge and William Hull ===
Between 1631 and 1632, Archbishop Abbot instituted the controversial predestinarian and puritan William Bridge as rector of St Peter Hungate, as part of an evangelical agenda. After granting him a preaching licence, Abbot, on 12 April 1632, also permitted Bridge to hold Hungate alongside the chaplaincy of St George Tombland. At this time, Augustine Scottow sat on the vestry of the church. Bridge abandoned both his offices by early 1637. On 9 June that year, commissioners of the Bishop of Norwich Matthew Wren reported that the churchwardens of St Peter Hungate as well as of other churches in the city were the most troublesome when it came to evading Wren's high church injunctions against them. In 1638, Bridge was ejected and excommunicated.

Clare Haynes has argued that in the 18th century, the church was "already heritagized" before there was a word for heritage, as it "had long been viewed as an inheritance to be valued and passed on."

St Peter Hungate was one of the first churches in Norwich to be affected by the Oxford Movement. William Hull, rector from 1871 to 1901, led ritualistic services with candles, incense and banners. Hull's obituary in the Daily Press on 15 April 1901 describes the church as "one of the most fashionable places of worship in Norwich", noting that the congregations were so large that the choir was forced to squeeze through them in single file.

=== 1868–1936: Decline in funding, risk of redundancy, and restorations ===
From 1868, the Church of England was halted from funding its church maintenance on a compulsory rate on local property owners, and had to maintain its buildings with voluntary contributions. Demographic changes were also taking place, leading to the depopulation of town and city centres. This led St Peter Hungate to struggle to pay for basic maintenance and keep an active congregation. By 1888, the church's fabric was in decline, and by 1897 weekly worship had apparently ended in the church due to the condition of the building.

The Church of England could not find money nor a religious use for the church. By the start of 1905, proceedings were underway to declare St Peter Hungate redundant, as well as for its partial demolition. The city's museum asked to keep the church's bells and roof, it was planned that the font and other furnishings would be distributed to new churches in the Norwich suburbs, and the churchyard was also expected to be adapted into the city's green space. This prompted a clamour of support to protect and preserve the building, including from local antiquarians, churchmen, and the rector who described the prospect of the church being "abolished" as a public scandal. The archdeacon of Norwich wrote to a local newspaper for support, calling the church "an exceedingly interesting monument of antiquity."

Just prior to the declaration of the church's redundancy, Prince Duleep Singh (1868–1926), a prominent local layperson with a wide antiquarian interest as well as membership of the Norfolk and Norwich Archaeological Society (NNAS) and the Society for the Protection of Ancient Buildings (SPAB), intervened. He acted as an intermediary to secure the backing of the SPAB on the condition that their architect would be employed for the restoration, and sufficient funds for restoration were found through their combined advocacy. The Church of England, individuals, and voluntary organisations thus worked to restore the church; the plans of the architect were supervised by both Duleep Singh and the diocese. The church saw restoration from 1906, and reopened for services in 1908.

Services ended again in the church after a short time, leading to another use being sought for the building. Provision already existed in the parish and neighbouring parishes, halting raised ideas to turn it into a parish room or mission hall. The church found use as a drill hall for the Church Lad's Brigade.

By the late 1920s, as a result of a lack of a program of maintenance and management, Hungate had returned to a state in which it needed immediate repair. There grew an increasingly active lobby in Norwich with the goal of preserving the historic fabric of the city, and this group kept a watching brief on the church. In 1929, the parish borrowed some money from NNAS to buy wire guards that would protect the rest of the stained glass, and the bishop told the Lad's Brigade to stop using the church, under pressure from the NNAS. It became expected that the church be preserved not by the Church of England but by "the enthusiasts and lovers of archaeology." Clare Haynes has argued that the expulsion of the Lad's Brigade from the church marked its secularization. In 1931, the church was again threatened with demolition, prompting the Norfolk Archaeological Trust to raise money for its repair.

=== Redundancy ===
The church was made redundant in 1936, and was converted into a museum of church art that year. Initially named the Museum of Ecclesiastical Art, it was later renamed Hungate Museum of Church Art. The building became Grade I listed in 1954. The museum closed in 1995, was privately occupied until 2006, then passed into the care of Norwich Historic Churches Trust in 2008. That year, the exhibition space for medieval heritage and art known as Hungate Medieval Art was formed. Hungate Medieval Art opened in April 2009. In 2015, people could pay to rub replica monumental brasses at the museum's Brass Rubbing Centre. The chancel roof underwent significant repairs in 2016. In 2025, the church was added to Historic England's Heritage at Risk Register.

== Architecture ==
The church has a nave, chancel, north and south transepts, a south porch, and a west tower.

=== Exterior ===
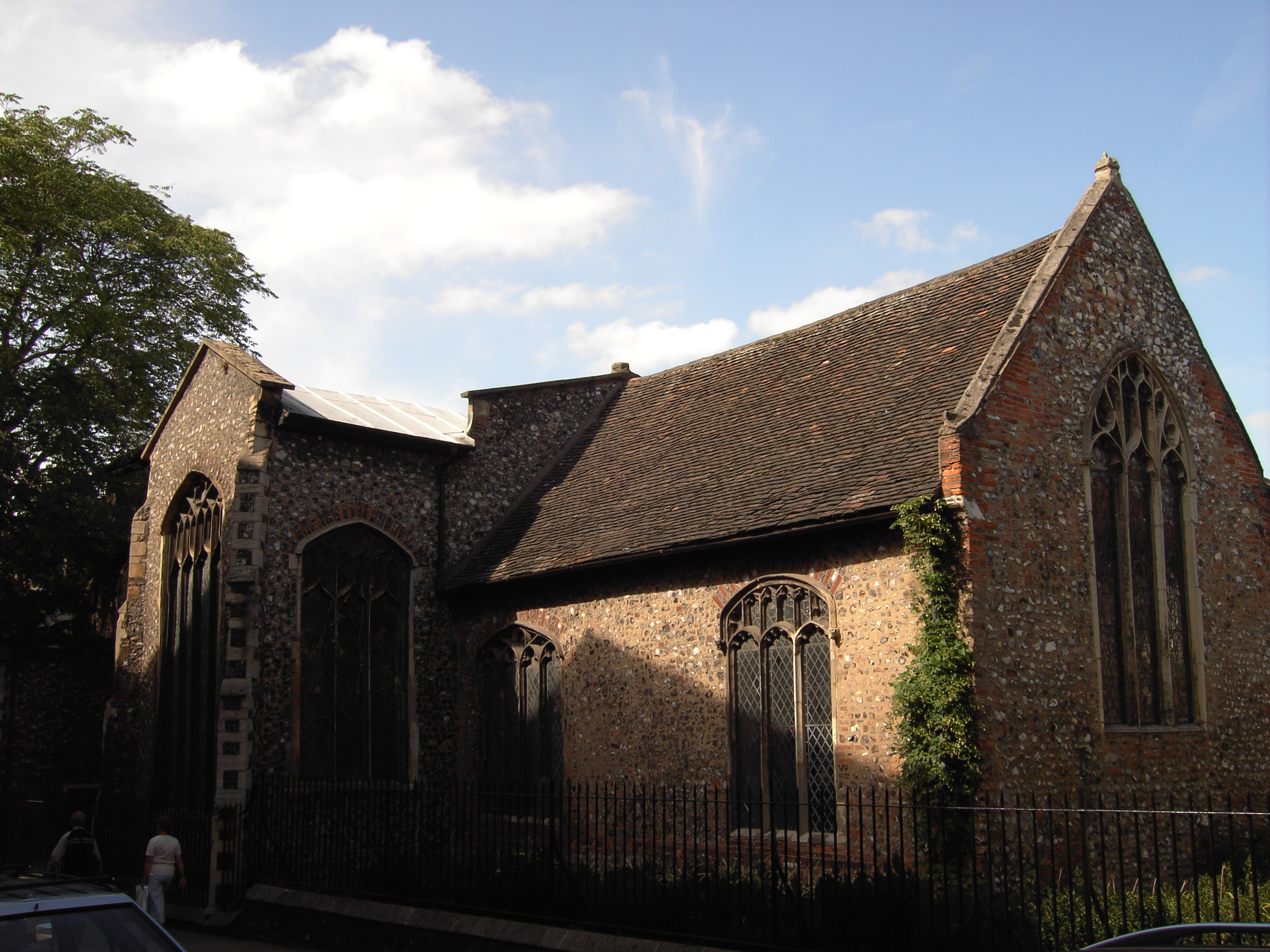
St Peter Hungate's south transept (left) and chancel (right)

Both the nave and the transepts of the church were completely rebuilt in black flint by John and Margaret Paston in 1458. There is a stone in a buttress near the north door which displays a tree trunk without branches, representing the decay of the old church, with a new shoot, representing the new building which was completed in 1460 as marked. The windows in both the nave and transept are uniform in a Perpendicular style.

The church's chancel was rebuilt in 1431 by Thomas Ingham. It collapsed and was thus rebuilt again in 1604. The current chancel consists of rough rubble that has been plastered over, and is of lower quality than the rest of the church. It is roofed with pin-tiles dating from 1604. The chancel windows have an older pattern than those in the nave and transepts, and feature trefoil tracery in their heads. In 1741, Francis Blomefield stated that much of the stained glass in the chancel remained. Neglect after this led to much of the glass being lost; what remains was collected together in the east window, now filled with pieces of medieval glass. This was removed for safety in 1897, though later reinstated. There was a hole in the chancel roof in 1897, covered only by a tarpaulin for two years.

The church's tower is square and is made of black flint. It was built in 1431 by Thomas Ingham. By the 1880s, the tower was crumbling and was at risk of falling onto passers by. That decade, a small amount of money was spent to fix the tower somewhat; Its unbattlemented belfry stage was taken down in 1881. Safety concerns remained, with an order being served on the churchwardens in 1888. The tower's present unusual pyramidal cap was added in 1906.

The south porch of the church was added in 1497 by Nicholas Ingham. The south porch has angle buttresses as well as a niche for a statue over its door.

=== Interior ===
The north and south doors are original and date to around 1460. They have tracery that is similar to the tracery in the windows.

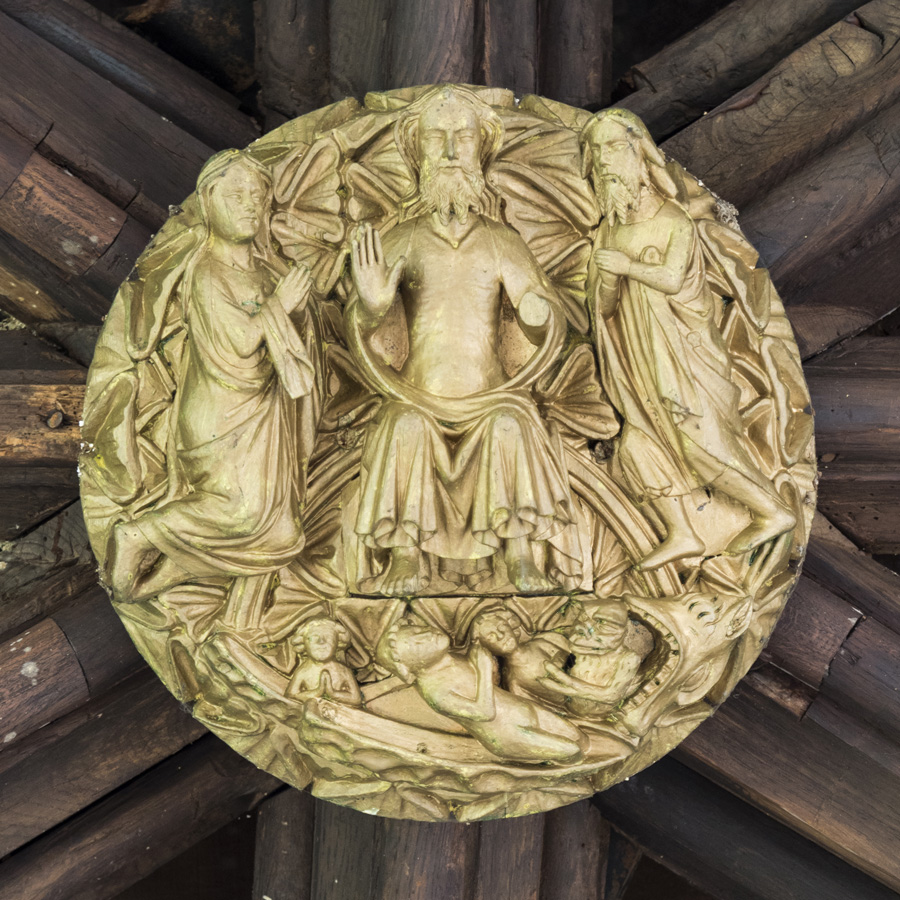
The nave ceiling of St Peter Hungate has a central boss of Christ in Judgement

The nave features wall-arcading that frames each window. Its roof has a low pitch and is adorned with angels with scrolls. Around a central boss of Christ in Judgement, the nave ceiling has four further bosses with each corresponding to one of the Four Evangelists. There are two squints from the nave into the transepts.

A niche is present in the south transept; this held a statue of John the Baptist. There is a window in the south transept; its headstops are intended to represent John and Margaret Paston. In the north transept are doors to the rood-stair.

== Furnishings ==
The church's font is from the 15th century. Its cover has an open-work steeple and is dated to 1605. The church had a rood screen, though this was destroyed when the chancel collapsed in 1604 and never replaced. The original square pews of the church were replace with chairs due to the influence of the Oxford Movement. There is a single monument in the church; it is on the west wall and memorialises Matthew Goss, who died in 1799.

The museum purchased a positive organ in 1938 from a monastery at Lucca, Tuscany Italy.

== Location ==
The church is located at the junction of three streets. Elm Hill is located to the church's north, and was a site for homes, workshops, and warehouses of wealthy merchants. At the corner of the churchyard is the Briton's Arms, which is a uniquely surviving smaller 15th-century structure in the area. The house may have been built as a residence for a laysisterhood, which was a type of beguinage, possibly housing a group of women who resembled Continental Beguines during the time of Julian of Norwich.

== Burials ==
- John Paston, buried in a now-unmarked grave in front of the niche in the south transept.
- Nicholas Ingham, buried in the south porch he added in 1497.

== Parish ==
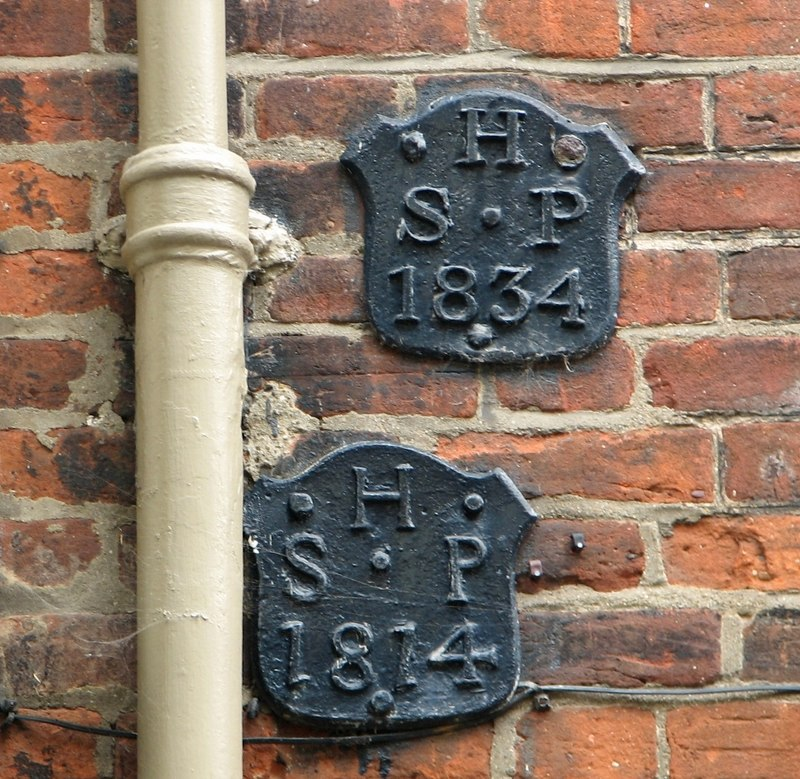
Parish boundary markers for St Peter Hungate on Elm Hill, dated to 1834 and 1814

In 1268, the parish of St Peter Hungate was one of four to present a case concerning chaplain William de Runham; representatives of the parish alleged that Runham had taken refuge in the church of St Cuthbert after committing a homicide. In 1812, new premises were bought in the parish for a charity school, paid for in part by the Norfolk and Norwich National Society and also in part from old charity school assets, though by 1818 this school was no longer in existence.

== Sources ==
- Haynes, Clare (2022). "The Redundant Church: Heritage Management of the Religious-Sacred-Secular Nexus". In van den Hemel, Ernst; Salemink, Oscar; Stengs, Irene (eds.). Managing Sacralities: Competing and Converging Claims of Religious Heritage.
- Rawcliffe, Carole; Wilson, Richard, eds. (2004). Norwich since 1550. London; New York: Hambledon & London. ISBN 978-1-85285-450-8.
