= Pettus Independent School District =

School district in Texas, United States

Address
- 500 North May Street Pettus, Texas, 78146; United States

District information
- Grades: PK–12
- Schools: 2
- NCES District ID: 4834770

Students and staff
- Students: 394 (2023–2024)
- Teachers: 37.34 (on an FTE basis)
- Student–teacher ratio: 10.55:1

Other information
- Website: www.pettusisd.org

Pettus Independent School District is a public school district based in the community of Pettus, Texas (USA). In addition to Pettus, the district serves the communities of Tuleta, Tulsita, and Normanna. While the district is mostly located in Bee County, a small portion of the district extends into Karnes County.

== Schools ==
Pettus ISD has two campuses -

- Pettus Secondary School (Grades 6-12)
- Pettus Elementary School (Grades PreK-5).

In 2009, the school district was rated "academically acceptable" by the Texas Education Agency.
