= Tuleta, Texas =

- Census-designated place
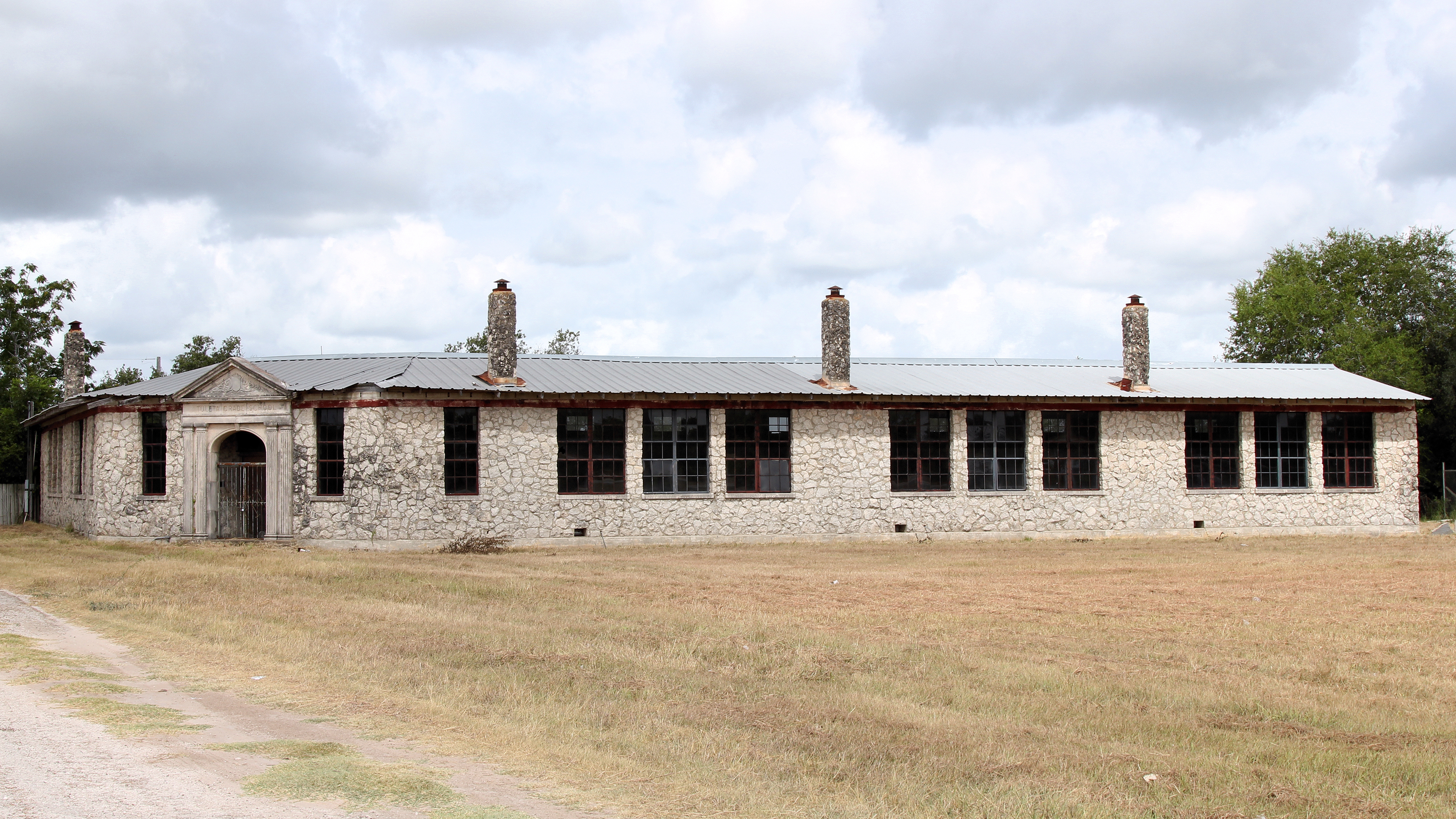
- The former Tuleta grade school, August 2018

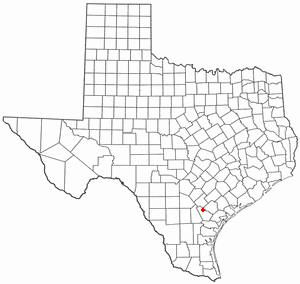
- Location of Tuleta, Texas

- Coordinates: 28°34′22″N 97°47′48″W
- Country: United States
- State: Texas
- County: Bee

Area
  - Total: 4.5 sq mi (11.6 km^{2})
  - Land: 4.5 sq mi (11.6 km^{2})
  - Water: 0 sq mi (0.0 km^{2})
- Elevation: 325 ft (99 m)

Population (2020)
  - Total: 231
  - Density: 51.6/sq mi (19.9/km^{2})
- Time zone: UTC-6 (Central (CST))
  - Summer (DST): UTC-5 (CDT)
- ZIP code: 78162
- Area code: 361
- FIPS code: 48-73856
- GNIS feature ID: 1370198

Tuleta is a census-designated place (CDP) in Bee County, Texas, United States. The population was 231 at the 2020 census.

== History ==
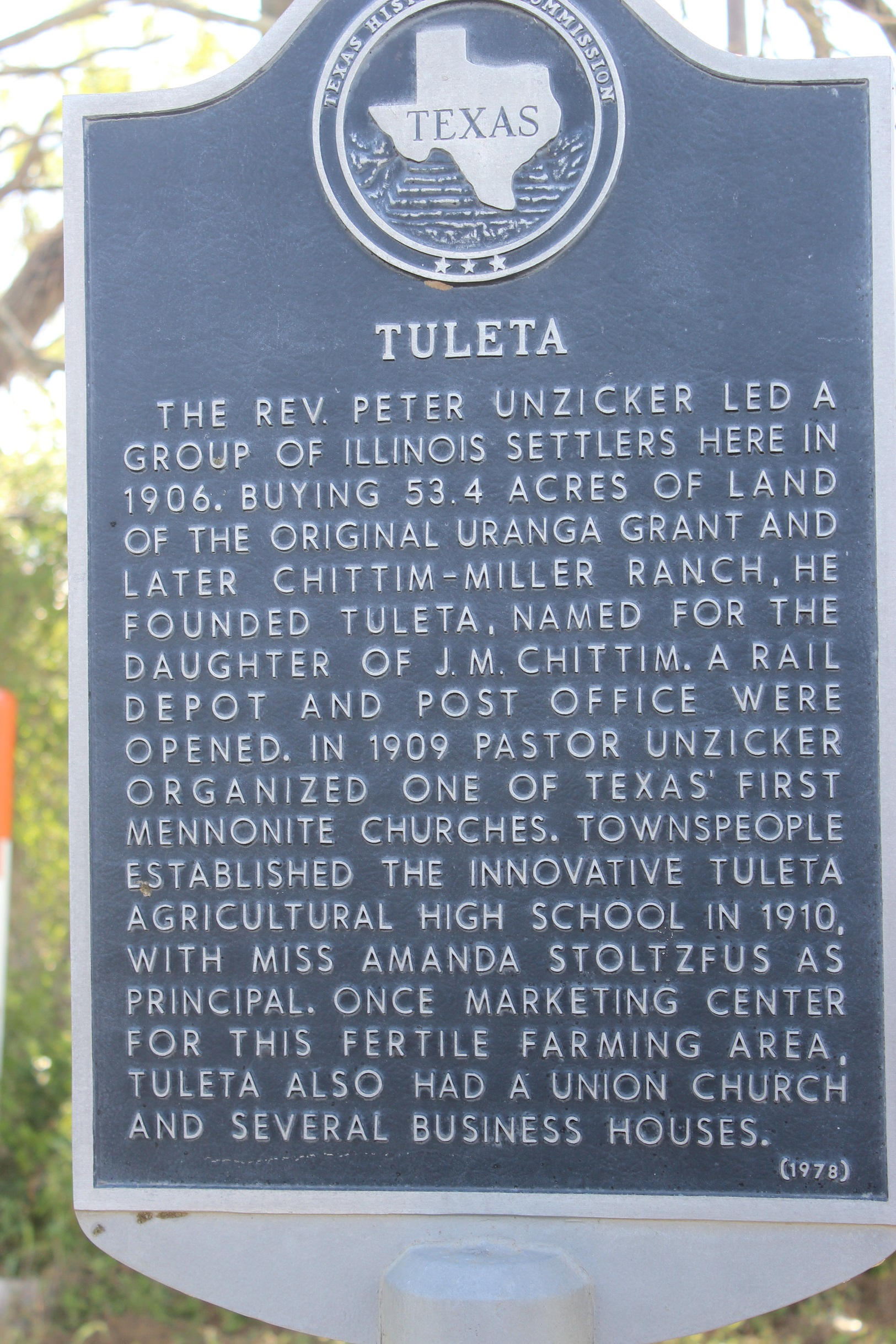
Tuleta historic marker, September 2016

Tuleta was founded by Peter Unzicker, a Mennonite minister, who brought a colony of Mennonites from Cullom, Illinois, in 1906. Unzicker, a German, purchased 54.5 acres (22.1 ha) of land from the Chittim-Miller ranch for the townsite, which was named for J. M. Chittim's daughter. The San Antonio and Aransas Pass Railway was built across the ranch in 1881. The depot opened in Tuleta in 1906; the following year the post office opened. The Mennonite church, built that year, was used for school on weekdays. In 1910, Amanda Stoltzfus organized the Tuleta Agriculture High School, the first of its kind in Texas; its faculty came from such prestigious institutions as Smith College and the University of Wisconsin. Stoltzfus, the principal, offered instruction in sewing and cooking for girls and manual training and agriculture for boys. The school had dormitories for boarders.

Tuleta once had three churches-Mennonite, Presbyterian, and Baptist-of which only the Baptist remained in 1990. Among the early businesses were Stoltzfus Mercantile Company and Gin, Unzicker Grocery and Grist Mill, Dirks Brothers Lumber Yard and Garage, Speer's Coffee Shop, the Rapp Hotel, and the Hall Hotel. Oil and gas were discovered west of Tuleta in 1929, when the population was 150. Several oil companies were still in operation in 1990, as were a grocery store, a water well service, and a community center. The community celebrates Tuleta Day on the second Saturday in August. In 1989, its population was 189. In 1990, it was 98. The population reached 292 in 2000.

== Geography ==
Tuleta is located in northern Bee County at 28°34′22″N 97°47′48″W (28.572742, -97.796551). It is situated on U.S. Route 181, 12 miles (19 km) north of Beeville, the county seat.

According to the United States Census Bureau, the CDP has a total area of 4.5 square miles (11.6 km^{2}), all land.

== Demographics ==
Historical population
Census	Pop.	Note	%±
2000	292		—
2010	288		−1.4%
2020	231		−19.8%
U.S. Decennial Census; 1850–1900 1910; 1920 1930 1940; 1950 1960 1970; 1980 1990 2000; 2010 2020

Tuleta was first listed as a census designated place in the 2000 U.S. census.

Tuleta CDP, Texas – Racial and ethnic composition Note: the US Census treats Hispanic/Latino as an ethnic category. This table excludes Latinos from the racial categories and assigns them to a separate category. Hispanics/Latinos may be of any race.
Race / Ethnicity (NH = Non-Hispanic)	Pop 2000	Pop 2010	Pop 2020	% 2000	% 2010	% 2020
White alone (NH)	174	169	129	59.59%	58.68%	55.84%
Black or African American alone (NH)	1	0	0	0.34%	0.00%	0.00%
Native American or Alaska Native alone (NH)	0	2	0	0.00%	0.69%	0.00%
Asian alone (NH)	0	1	0	0.00%	0.35%	0.00%
Pacific Islander alone (NH)	0	0	0	0.00%	0.00%	0.00%
Other race alone (NH)	0	0	0	0.00%	0.00%	0.00%
Mixed race or Multiracial (NH)	1	4	12	0.34%	1.39%	5.19%
Hispanic or Latino (any race)	116	112	90	39.73%	38.89%	38.96%
Total	292	288	231	100.00%	100.00%	100.00%

=== 2000 census ===
As of the census of 2000, there were 292 people, 119 households, and 84 families residing in the CDP. The population density was 65.2 inhabitants per square mile (25.2/km^{2}). There were 135 housing units at an average density of 30.1 per square mile (11.6/km^{2}). The racial makeup of the CDP was 81.51% White, 0.68% African American, 1.03% Native American, 13.70% from other races, and 3.08% from two or more races. Hispanic or Latino of any race were 39.73% of the population.

There were 119 households, out of which 32.8% had children under the age of 18 living with them, 58.8% were married couples living together, 10.1% had a female householder with no husband present, and 28.6% were non-families. 27.7% of all households were made up of individuals, and 16.8% had someone living alone who was 65 years of age or older. The average household size was 2.45 and the average family size was 2.99.

In the CDP, the population was spread out, with 27.7% under the age of 18, 5.5% from 18 to 24, 26.7% from 25 to 44, 20.2% from 45 to 64, and 19.9% who were 65 years of age or older. The median age was 38 years. For every 100 females, there were 96.0 males. For every 100 females age 18 and over, there were 91.8 males.

The median income for a household in the CDP was $22,500, and the median income for a family was $31,250. Males had a median income of $28,750 versus $13,125 for females. The per capita income for the CDP was $15,333. About 11.6% of families and 14.9% of the population were below the poverty line, including 16.9% of those under the age of eighteen and 21.7% of those 65 or over.

== Education ==
Tuleta is served by the Pettus Independent School District.

== See also ==
- List of census-designated places in Texas
