= Norwich Society =

Organisation to help preserve historical buildings in Norwich, England

The Norwich Society was established in 1923 to help preserve the historical buildings in Norwich, Norfolk. It aims to promote high quality town planning within the city.

The Norwich Society has a set of declared aims to:

- Encourage high standards of architecture and town planning in Norwich
- Stimulate public interest in and care for the beauty, history and character of the City and its surroundings
- Encourage the preservation, development and improvement of features of general public amenity or historic interest
- Pursue these ends by means of meetings, exhibitions, lectures, publications, other forms of instruction and publicity, by co-operation with the Local Authorities and other bodies, and promotion of schemes of a charitable nature.

To fulfill these aims it gathers evidence, identifies issues, promotes them publicly, develops networks, works with partners, persuades planners, developers, architects and, above all, maintains its independence. It does not receive any finance from "interested parties". Instead, it relies for its funding on membership subscriptions and bequests.

The Society was founded in 1923 as a protest and pressure group. At that time the mediaeval city of Norwich was in the process of modernizing in the wake of the great social upheavals of the First World War (1914–1918). Amongst other unsuitable civic plans of the time was a proposal to radically alter the 14th century Bishop Bridge across the River Wensum, close to the Anglican cathedral, to take more motor traffic. Opposition from leading antiquarians and architects, who later formed the Society, led to the bridge being preserved by a listing order from the then Ministry of Works in London. This success was followed by similar preservation orders to avoid possible similar future threats to protect the cathedral and its Close, as well as the castle and Guildhall, and a number of other fine old buildings.

Another major conservation success came in the 1930s, with the rescue from slum clearance plans of the 16th century Elm Hill, today one of the finest remaining streets of its type in England.

In the 21st century, the Norwich Society continues to flourish, active not only in conservation but in the promotion of excellence in innovative architecture and development with its Design Awards. It continues to follow the declaration of its founding membership:

"To stimulate historic interest in the city and civic pride amongst its citizens; to preserve all things of beauty; all buildings and objects of antiquarian and architectural worth; to exercise a vigilant opposition to all acts of vandalism and generally to work for a fairer City".

It does this by:

- Scrutinising local authority city development planning proposals to encourage the highest possible standards
- Identifying planning and development needs and arguing for them with the relevant authorities
- Gathering evidence of problems and concerns and making the case for change
