= Texas Recreational Road 8 =

Highway in Texas

Recreational Road 8
- RE 8 highlighted in red

Route information
- Maintained by TxDOT
- Length: 1.058 mi (1.703 km)
- Existed: June 15, 1981–present

Major junctions
- South end: SH 72 near Calliham
- North end: Quail Run Road

Location
- Country: United States
- State: Texas
- Counties: McMullen

Highway system
- Highways in Texas; Interstate; US; State; Former; Toll; Loops; Spurs; FM/RM; Park; Rec
← PR 8	→ SH 9

Recreational Road 8 (RE 8) is a Recreational Road located in McMullen County in the southern portion of the U.S. state of Texas. The highway is approximately 1.1 miles (1.8 km) in length, and connects Texas State Highway 72 (SH 72) to the community of Calliham and Choke Canyon State Park. The roadway travels through rural areas and central Calliham. Calliham was first laid out in 1922, and a road first appeared in the location of RE 8 by 1940. Farm to Market Road 99 (FM 99) was designated in the location of RE 8 in 1954. Recreational Road 8 was officially designated in June 1981, after FM 99 was relocated. The highway was cancelled and relocated in 1983. The highway is currently the only route to deviate from the recreational road criteria.

== Route description ==
RE 8 begins at an at-grade intersection with SH 72 south of the unincorporated community of Calliham. The highway proceeds as a two-lane, paved road, traveling northward toward Calliham. As it travels through mainly rural areas, the route intersects a small dirt road before entering the southern portion of Calliham. The road intersects Fletcher Street and continues past several houses, traveling parallel to Naylor Street for a short distance before it intersects Ritcher Street, where it bends northeastward and continues. The road passes a large RV park and intersects Deer Trail before continuing past several houses. It proceeds to its northern terminus, an intersection with Quail Run Road at the edge of Choke Canyon State Park. A long park road continues north into the park, providing access to several campgrounds and recreational areas.

The highway is maintained by the Texas Department of Transportation (TxDOT). RE 8 is currently the only route in the Recreational Road system to deviate from the system criteria. TxDOT defines a Recreational Road as a route which travels "to a recognized recreational area", while RE 8 serves Choke Canyon State Park.

== History ==
Farm to Market Road 99
- Location: Choke Canyon Reservoir
- Length: 1.6 mi (2.6 km)
- Existed: December 1, 1954–1981

The community of Calliham was first settled in 1918, and was known as Guffeyola. The settlement was a simple camp city, but boomed in 1922 when oil was discovered nearby. In 1923, due to the rapid expansion, J. W. Stephenson laid out the plan for the townsite for the community, which contained all roads and sites. The community continued to expand into the 1930s. By 1940, an unimproved dirt road connected central Calliham to camps north of the community. The road crossed the Frio River on a concrete bridge, and had a single cattle guard located on its course. By 1951, the road's first block from its southern terminus was improved to a graded, bituminous surface, made up of crushed rock and asphalt. On October 28, 1952, FM 2153 was designated along the course of the highway, for a length of approximately 5.5 miles (8.9 km). On October 13, 1954, the Texas Transportation Commission (TTC) cancelled FM 2153, and extended FM 99 over its course. The designation was officially passed by the Texas State Highway Department's Administration Circle on December 1, 1954.

By 1956, the entire length of the highway had been graded and resurfaced with crushed rock, as well as being minorly straightened. Between then and 1961, the route was listed as being a Federal Aid Secondary Road, its surface was improved to bituminous, the bridge over the Frio River was replaced, and the road's course was minorly straightened. On March 27, 1981, FM 99 was approved to be relocated around the location of the newly created Choke Canyon Reservoir. The relocation was officially designated on June 15, 1981. On April 3, 1981, RE 8 was approved to be designated over the relocated portion of FM 99. The designation was made official the same day FM 99 was relocated. On June 29, 1983, the TTC approved the cancellation and redesignation of RE 8, and on August 18, 1983 the redesignation was approved. The route was shifted to its present location, with a total length of about 1.4 miles (2.3 km). In 1988, Calliham was shifted southward from the Choke Canyon Reservoir, causing RE 8 to be shortened by about 0.3 miles (0.48 km).

== Major intersections ==
The entire route is in McMullen County.

Location	mi	km	Destinations	Notes
	0.000	0.000	SH 72 – Tilden	Southern terminus
Calliham	0.371	0.597	CR 74 (Fletcher Street)	Western end of CR 74
Calliham	0.598	0.962	CR 72 (Myrtle Lane)	Western end of CR 72
Calliham	0.757	1.218	CR 70 (Ritcher Street)	Western end of CR 70
Calliham	1.058	1.703	CR 68 (Quail Run Road)	Northern terminus
1.000 mi = 1.609 km; 1.000 km = 0.621 mi
