= National Register of Historic Places listings in McMullen County, Texas =

Location of McMullen County in Texas

This is a list of the National Register of Historic Places listings in McMullen County, Texas.

This is intended to be a complete list of properties listed on the National Register of Historic Places in McMullen County, Texas. There is one property listed on the National Register in the county.

This National Park Service list is complete through NPS recent listings posted March 21, 2025.

== Current listings ==
	Name on the Register	Image	Date listed	Location	City or town	Description
1	Mustang Branch Site		August 10, 1978 (#78003096)	Address restricted	Calliham	

== See also ==
- National Register of Historic Places listings in Texas
- Recorded Texas Historic Landmarks in McMullen County
