= Texas Park Road 8 =

Road in Texas, United States

PR 8
- PR 8 highlighted in red

Route information
- Maintained by TxDOT
- Length: 2.405 mi (3.870 km)
- Existed: June 22, 1937–present

Major junctions
- South end: FM 700 in Big Spring
- North end: FM 700 in Big Spring

Location
- Country: United States
- State: Texas
- Counties: Howard

Highway system
- Highways in Texas; Interstate; US; State; Former; Toll; Loops; Spurs; FM/RM; Park; Rec
← FM 8	→ RE 8

Park Road 8 (PR 8) is a Park Road loop in Howard County in West Texas. The highway is approximately 2.405 miles (3.870 km) long, and loops through Big Spring State Park off of Farm to Market Road 700 (FM 700). The road is one of the eight original Park Roads incorporated into the state highway system in 1937.

== Route description ==
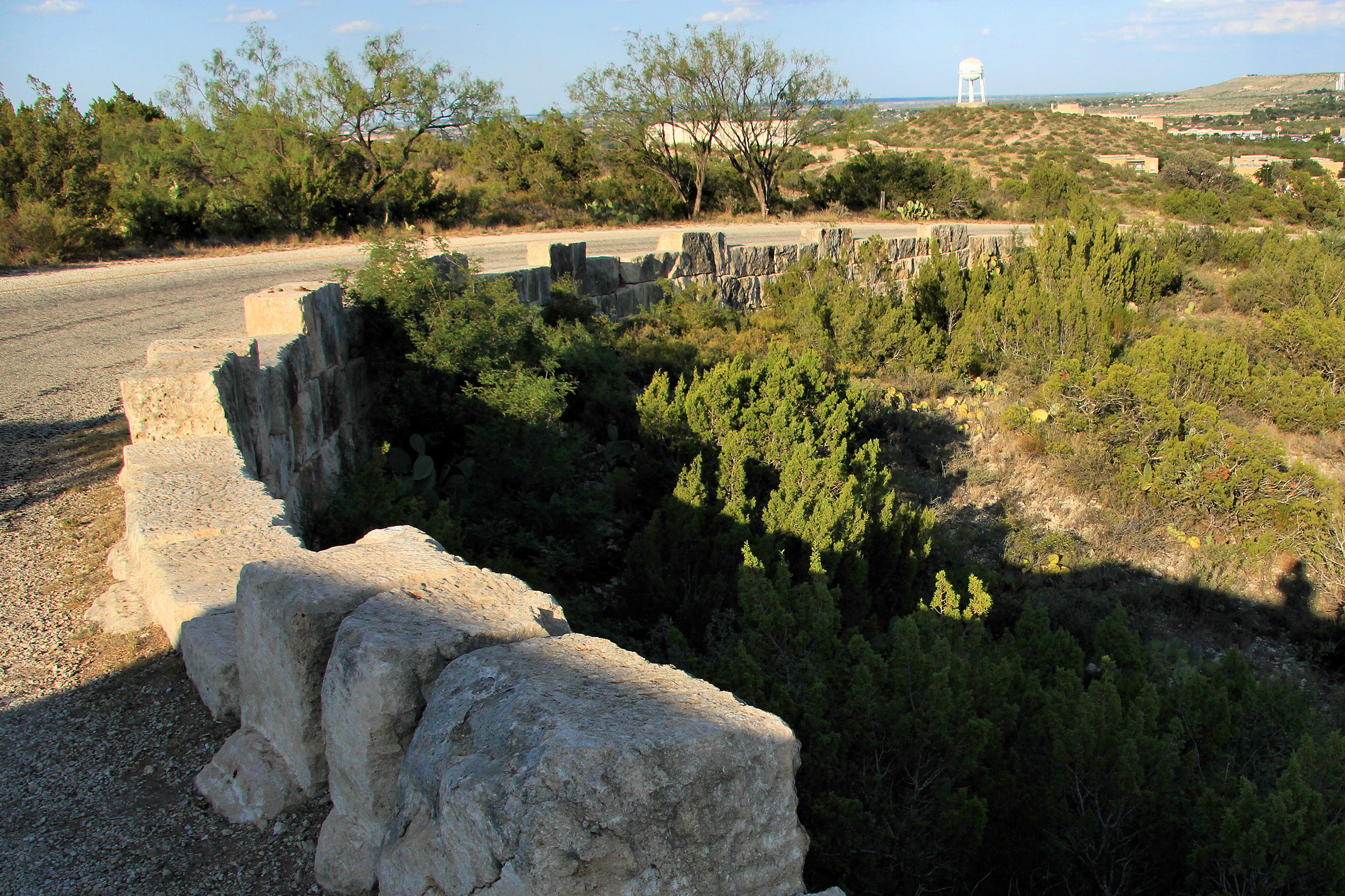
The CCC built retaining wall uses limestone blocks weighing up to two tons.

Park Road 8 begins at a T with FM 700 at the border of Big Spring State Park. The highway is a one-way, paved road. The road winds westward as it increases about 150 foot in elevation. It curves northward providing scenic overlooks of the City of Big Spring. The roadway descends eastward and intersects with itself at the entrance to the park. A .4 miles (0.64 km) length designated Park Road 8 North connects the ascending section with the descending section.

== History ==
The Civilian Conservation Corps began work on Park Road 8 during the construction of Big Spring State Park between 1934 and 1935. Retaining walls on the descending switchbacks were built with locally quarried limestone blocks, some of which weighed up to two tons. On September 22, 1936, the state highway commission initiated an investigation at the request of the state's parks board into the incorporation of certain park roads as part of the state highway system after which the highway commission would assume maintenance of these roads. The highway commission accepted the park road in Big Spring State Park and seven other parks as the original park roads in the state system on June 22, 1937.

== Major junctions ==
The entire road is in Howard County.

Location	mi	km	Destinations	Notes
Big Spring State Park	0	0.0	FM 700 – Big Spring	Southern terminus
Big Spring State Park	2.405	3.870	FM 700 – Big Spring	Northern terminus
1.000 mi = 1.609 km; 1.000 km = 0.621 mi
