= McMullen County Independent School District =

School district in Texas, United States

Address
- 901 River Street Tilden, TX, 78072; United States

District information
- Grades: PK–12
- Schools: 1
- NCES District ID: 4829940

Students and staff
- Students: 271 (2023–2024)
- Teachers: 26.90 (on an FTE basis)
- Student–teacher ratio: 10.07:1

Other information
- Website: www.mcisd.us

McMullen County Independent School District is a public school district based in the community of Tilden, Texas (USA). The district's boundaries parallel that of McMullen County.

The district has one campus, the McMullen County School, which serves students in grades pre-kindergarten through twelve.

In 2009, the school district was rated "academically acceptable" by the Texas Education Agency.
