= Coulson, Montana =

Ghost town in Montana, United States

Coordinates: 45°47′20″N 108°28′41″W

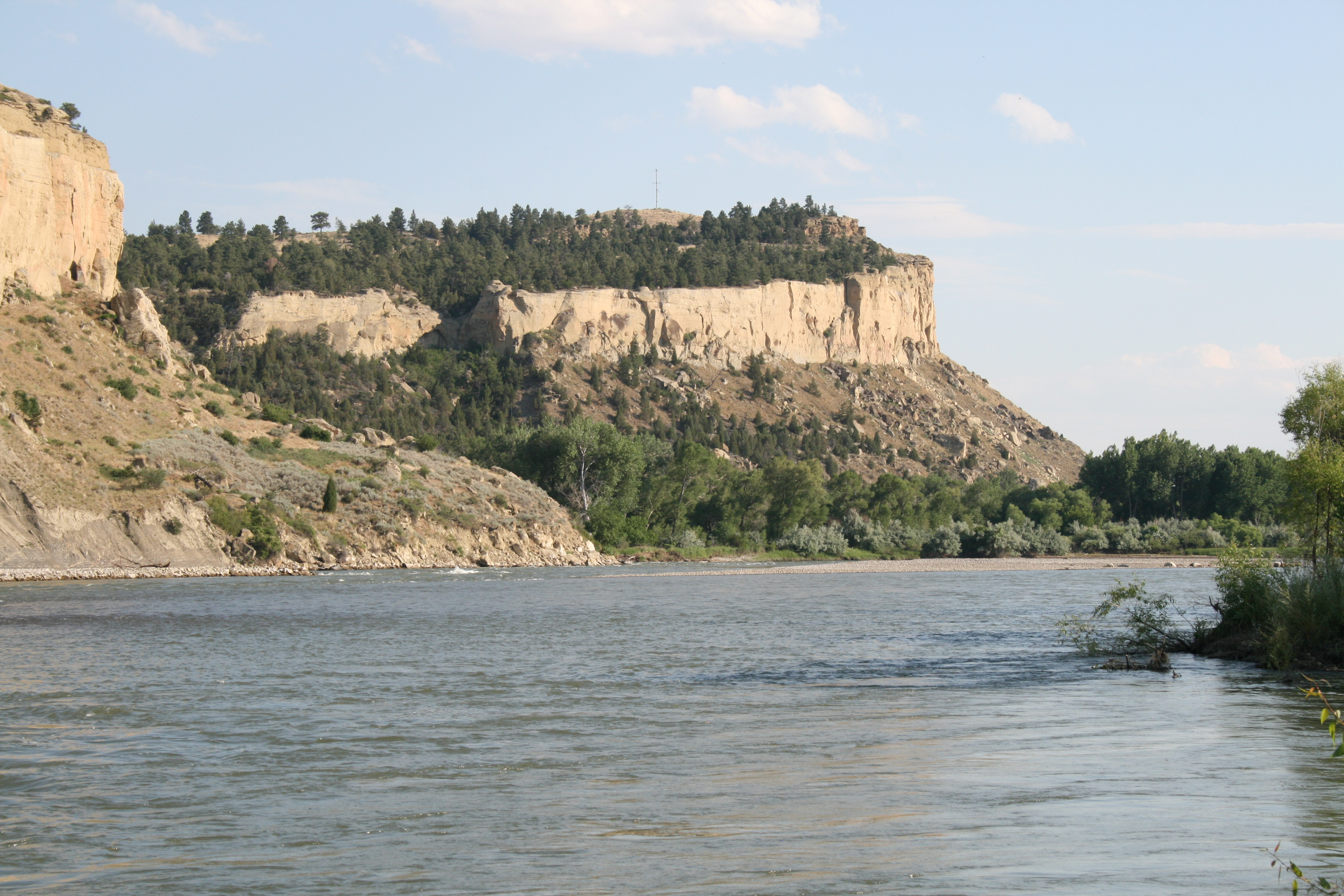
Across the river from where Coulson once stood is the Sacrifice Cliff

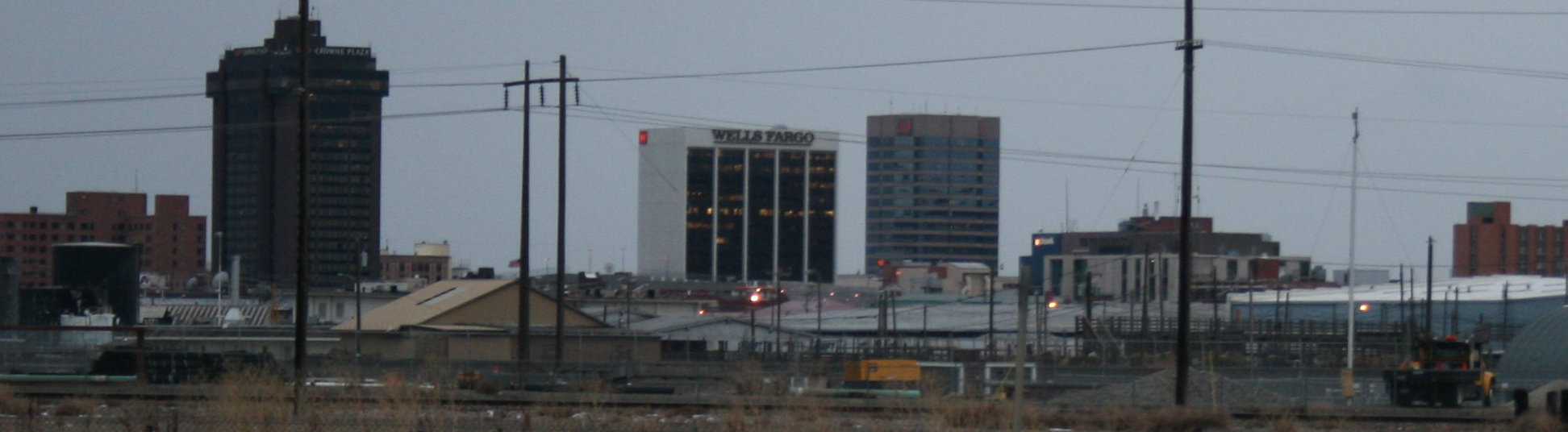
View of Billings from where Coulson stood.

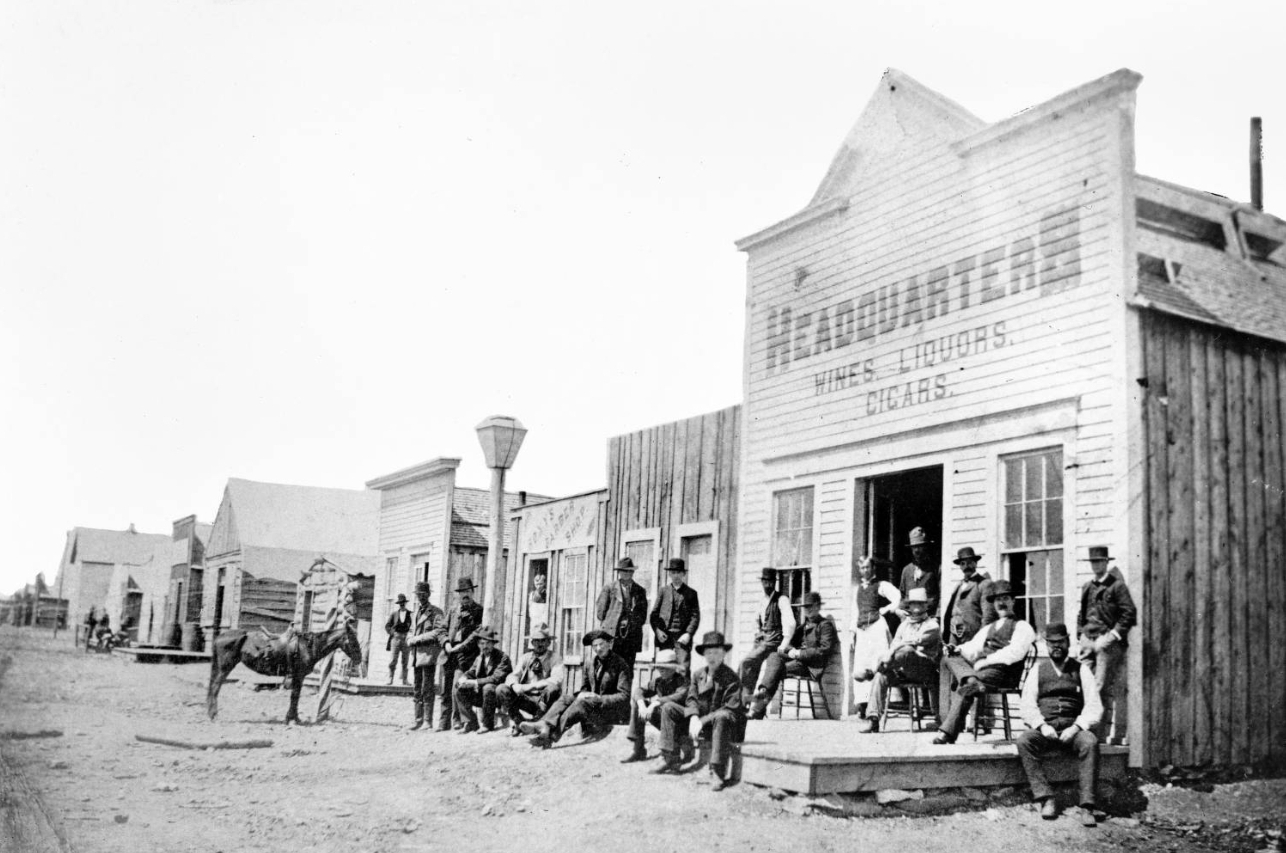
Coulson, Montana

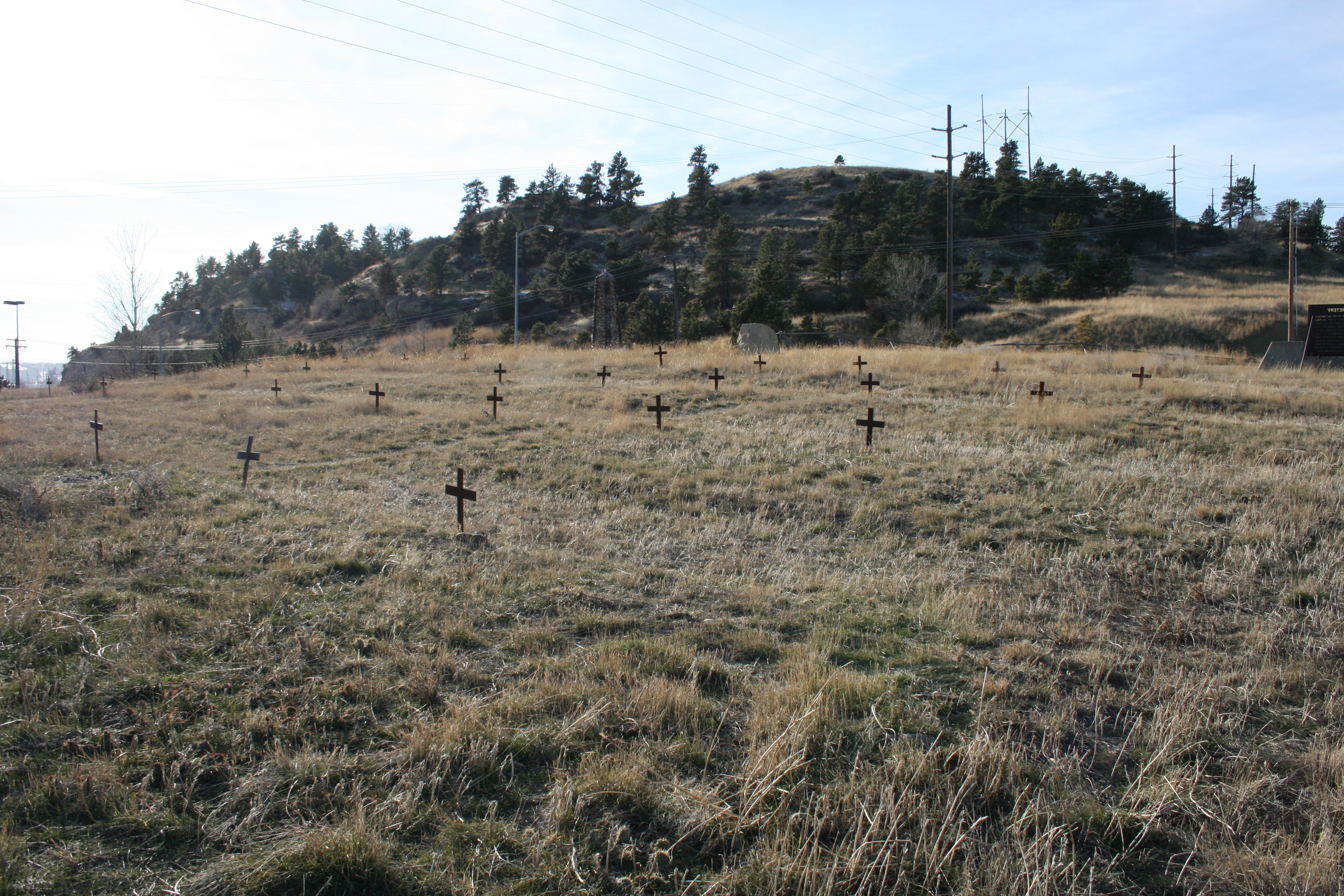
Coulson's Boot Hill cemetery as it looks today. It sits just above Main Street, the busiest street in Montana, in Billings Heights

Coulson is a ghost town located in Yellowstone County, Montana, United States, on the north bank of the Yellowstone River, approximately one mile east of present-day downtown Billings.
