= Boot Hill =

Type of American cemetery

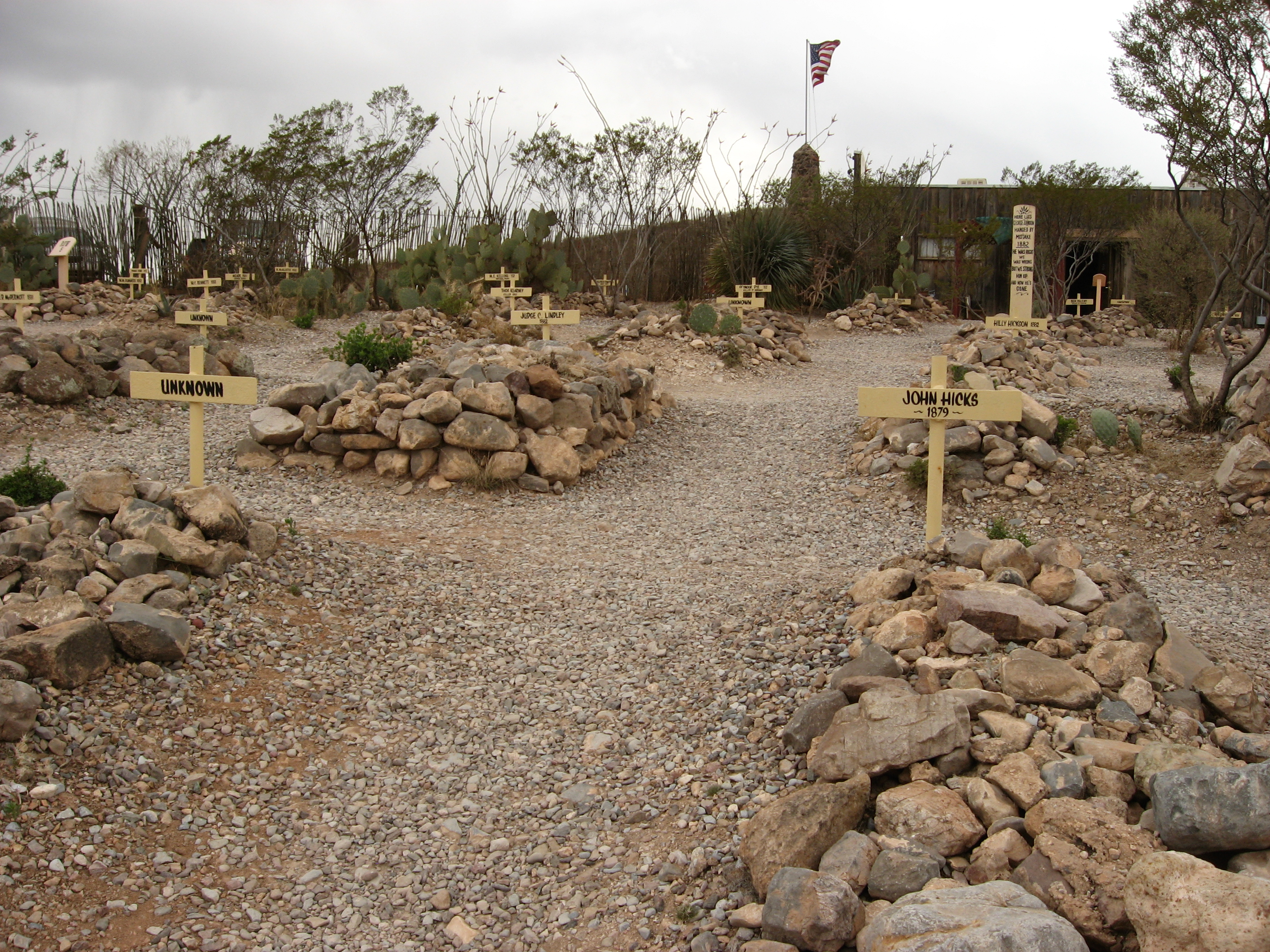
Tombstone, Arizona's Boothill Graveyard in 2009

Boot Hill, or boothill, is the generic name of many cemeteries, chiefly in the Western United States. During the 19th and early 20th centuries, it was a common name for the burial grounds for paupers.

== Origin of term ==
Although many towns use the name "Boot Hill", the first graveyard named "Boot Hill" was at Hays, Kansas, five years before the founding of Dodge City, Kansas. The meaning of why cemeteries were called "Boot Hills" has been lost, but three plausible reasons are given.

The first possible meaning of the term is based on poverty and alludes to the fact that many of the cemeteries' occupants were vagrants, or the impoverished. The concept is that those buried within either owned boots in such disrepair that no one salvaged the footwear, thus the footwear was left on the bodies at burial, or that the deceased owned no nicer formal clothing to place upon their bodies, which resulted in being interred wearing whatever clothing, and boots, they did possess.

The second concept is fairly similar - that those buried within (having been hermits, passers-through, or vagrants) had no family to contact to claim the deceased's valuables, which would include footwear.

Both of these concepts–one of poverty and worthless unsalvageable boots, the other of no next-of-kin to transfer ownership of valuables to–rely on the fact that during the 1800s, footwear had become an expensive commodity. This is because a shift in shoes occurred in the 19th century. While all clothing could be made by people in the 1800s with moderate sewing skills, and doing so was quite common in the western frontier of the U.S., making shoes and boots had become a craft of cordwainers that required the expensive technical skills and specialized tools of the shoe makers. Prior to this era, everyday wear shoes and boots were frequently made from materials, and in limited pattern sizes, that could be easily made at home, then buckled and laced-up to create a formed fit for various sized feet. A switch was made from pliable materials to stiff form-keeping leathers, allowing for footwear that was no longer ambidextrous, but tailored to each foot's specific shape, as well as individual length and width. This required further craftsmanship and work to create specifically bespoke footwear. Thus, the increased cost of Victorian footwear makes either of these two theories the most plausible.

The third concept is likely a romanticized one. This postulates that the occupants of Boot Hills were cowboys who "died with their boots on", the implication here being they died violently, as in gunfights or by hanging, and not of natural causes. This idea is the most commonly cited on tourist websites. In addition to this claim having numerous problems in the logic used to support it (i.e., significant numbers of people die while wearing footwear, for all kinds of reasons), there is no evidence to suggest that gunfights and hangings were so ubiquitous that entire cemeteries all across the western U.S. needed to be devoted to these types of violent unnatural deaths.

Another refers to a place where kings were crowned in Scotland, "Boot-Hill", supposedly named such because spectators would fill their boots with soil and empty them out so as to stand a little taller and see the coronation. It's possible that the name carried over to cemeteries by immigrants to suggest, tongue-in-cheek, that the interred had been crowned into the afterlife.

Despite the mystery of the term today, Boot Hill became a commonplace term for the neglected old municipal cemeteries throughout the U.S. West during the late 1800s and into the early 1900s as, more and more, families of means re-interred their deceased loved ones to the more elegant and exclusive grounds of the newer for-profit cemeteries. However, some Boot Hills became famous, such as the original in Dodge City, Kansas, or the Boot Hill in Tombstone, Arizona, because of three men involved in the so-called O.K. Corral shootout still being buried there.

== Boothill Graveyard ==
The most notable use of the name "Boot Hill" is at the Boothill Graveyard in Tombstone, Arizona. 31°43′11.6″N 110°04′13.6″W Formerly called the "Tombstone Cemetery", the plot features the graves of Billy Clanton, Frank McLaury and Tom McLaury; the three men who were killed during the famed Gunfight at the O.K. Corral.

Located on the northwest corner of the town, the graveyard is believed to hold over 300 persons, 205 of which are recorded. This was due to some people (especially Chinese and Jewish immigrants) being buried without record. There is a separate Jewish cemetery nearby with some markers restored, and there are also marked graves of Chinese. However, most of the loss was due to neglect of grave markers and theft of these wooden relics as souvenirs. For example, when former Tombstone Mayor John Clum visited Tombstone for the first Helldorado celebration in 1929, he was unable to locate the grave of his wife Mary, who had been buried in Boothill.

The Tombstone "boothill" cemetery was closed in late 1886, as the new "City Cemetery" on Allen Street opened. Thereafter, Boothill was referred to as the "old city cemetery" and neglected. It was used after that only to bury a few later outlaws (some legally hanged and one shot in a robbery), as well as a few colorful Western characters and one man (Emmett Crook Nunnally) who had spent many volunteer hours restoring it.

Currently, the Boothill Graveyard is open to the public for a $5 fee, and is a popular stop for tourists visiting Tombstone.

== Boot Hill Museum ==
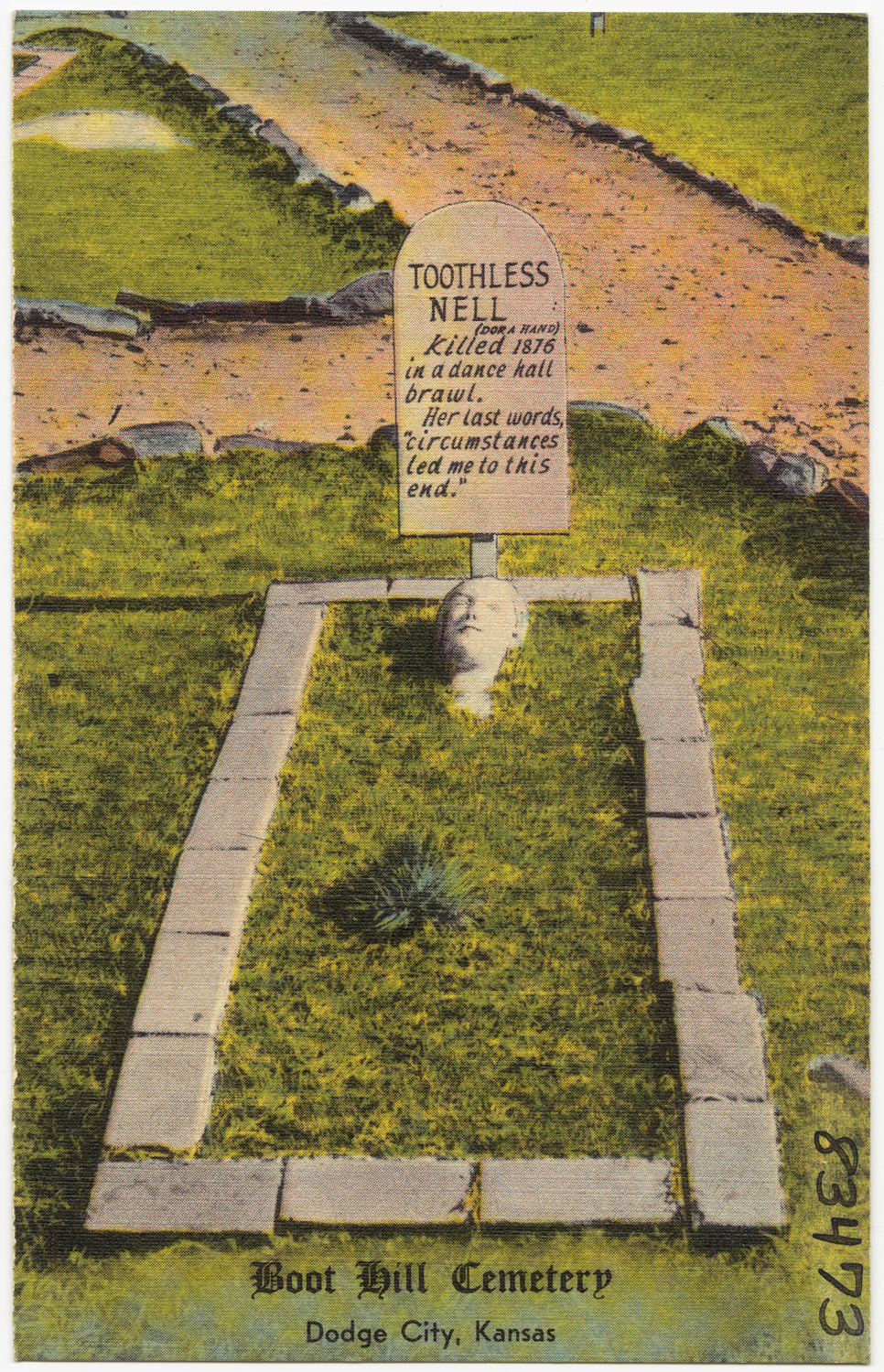
Tomb at Boot Hill Cemetery in Dodge City, Kansas

The Boot Hill Museum is located on the original location of the Boot Hill Cemetery in Dodge City, Kansas.

== In popular culture ==
Boot Hill is the name of the cemetery in Dodge City in the Gunsmoke radio series. In many episodes, the marshal (Matt Dillon) would allude to "putting you in Boot Hill", or "another man headed to Boot Hill". In the first season of the Gunsmoke television series, the introduction to each episode showed Matt Dillon walking around Boot Hill reflecting on the deaths of men buried there.

Boot Hill cemetery is a main plot point in the Twilight Zone episode Mr. Garrity and the Graves.

Boothill Graveyards are referenced in many films such as Tombstone (1993), Wyatt Earp (1994), The Magnificent Seven (1960), Back to the Future Part III (1990) and Gunfight at the O.K. Corral (1957), during which it was repeatedly sung over the recurring title theme song by Frankie Laine. In the later half of the movie Laine changes the theme to:

Boothill... Boothill...

So cold... so still...
There they lay side by side,
the killers that died,

in the Gunfight at O.K. Corral.

Boot Hill is the name of a role playing game first published in 1975 by TSR, Inc., the original publisher of Dungeons & Dragons. It was the third game released by TSR and notable as one of the first games to use ten-sided dice.

Finnish Western writer Esa Paloniemi published his collection of Western short stories Saapaskukkula (Boothill) in 2024.

Boot Hill also appears in the first-person shooter video game Borderlands 2, located in 'The Dust', and playing home to a 'truxican standoff'.

In the video game Fallout: New Vegas, Victor can say, “Next stop, Boot Hill” if provoked.

Carl Perkins wrote in 1959 a song "The Ballad of Boot Hill". Johnny Cash recorded it for Columbia Records and it was released in the same year.

A Spaghetti Western named Boot Hill was released in 1969 and it featured Terence Hill and Bud Spencer.

The first of three parts that compose the Neil Young song "Country Girl", that appears in his 1970 album with Crosby, Stills & Nash, "Déjà Vu", is called "Whiskey Boot Hill".

The Outlaws' song "Hurry Sundown" also references "lying" an unnamed character in "Boot Hill".

Several themes from Bob Dylan's soundtrack album "Pat Garrett and Billy The Kid" (1973) contain the verse "Up to Boot Hill they'd like to send ya".

The song "The Ballad of Billy the Kid" from Billy Joel's 1973 Album Piano Man contains the lyrics "And he never had a sweetheart, but he finally found a home, underneath the boothill grave that bears his name".

"Boot Hill" (unknown) is the first track on Stevie Ray Vaughan's 1991 posthumous release The Sky is Crying. It was recorded in early 1989 and is one of the last fully produced songs completed prior to his untimely death in 1990.

In Cricket, the term 'Boot Hill' is used to refer to the fielding position of short-leg because of its proximity to the batsman and high likelihood of being hit by the ball, making the position particularly dangerous. Players fielding in this position typically wear a helmet and other protection.

In the comic book series Preacher, the Saint of Killers rests at a tomb on Boot Hill when not actively pursuing his goals.

Boot Hill Cemetery is the name of the graveyard at Phantom Manor in Disneyland Paris.

In season 5 episode 16 of the animated series SpongeBob SquarePants, "Pest of the West", the character Spongebuck is told the old sheriff of Dead-Eye Gulch is at Boot Hill.

Boothill is a playable character in Honkai: Star Rail.

== Gallery ==
=== Tombstone, Arizona ===
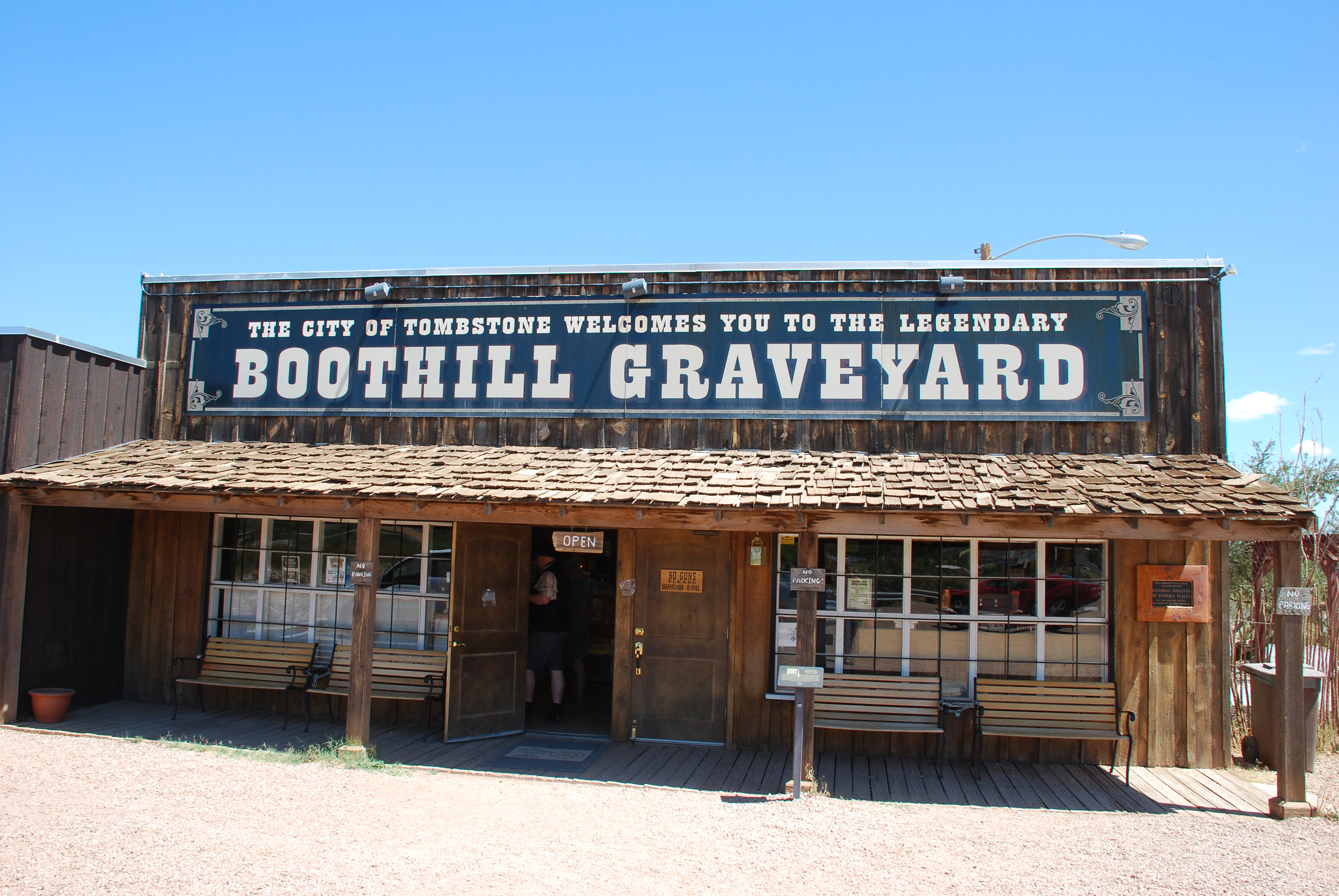
The entrance to Boothill Graveyard
31.720000°N 110.070278°W

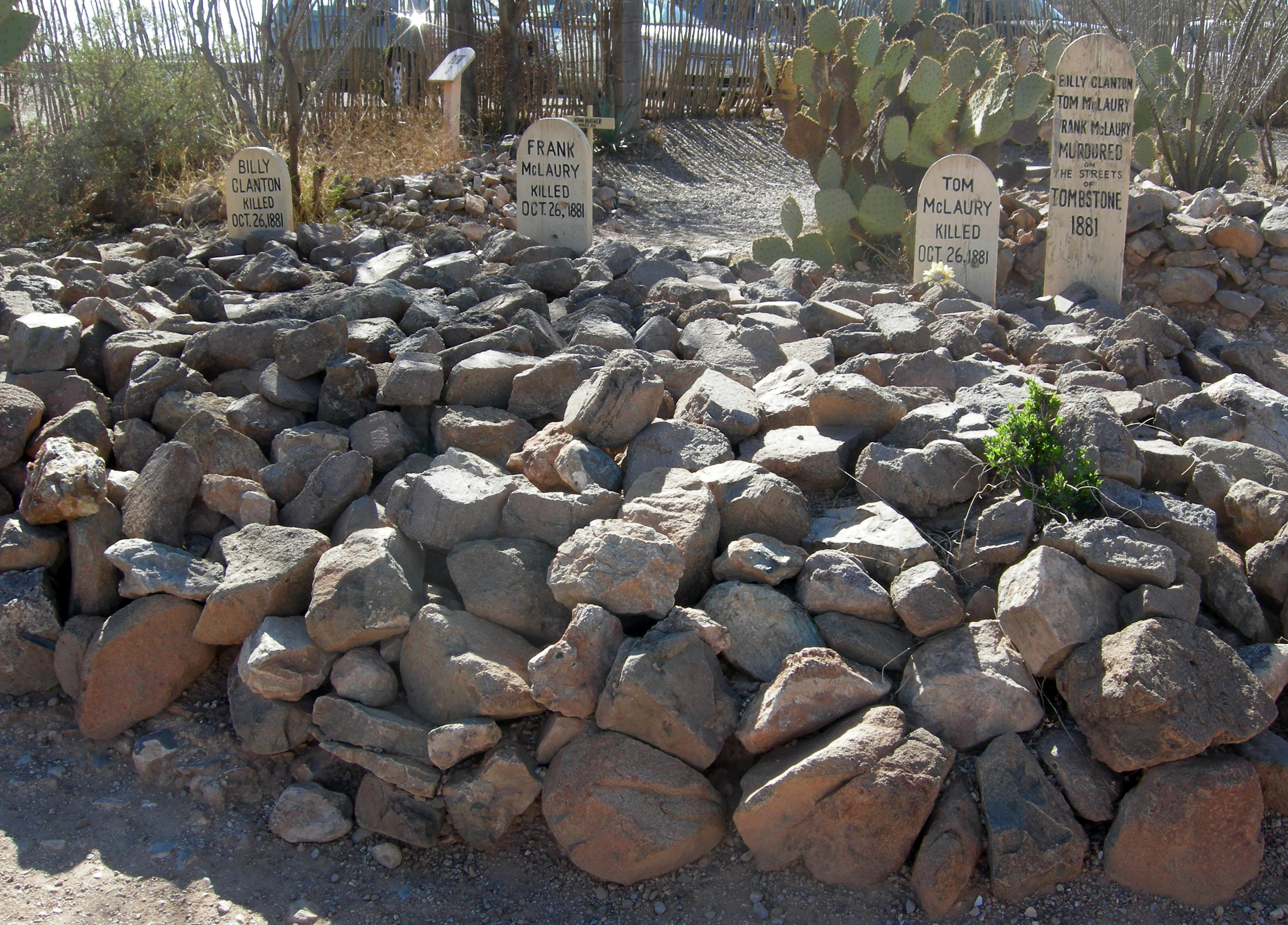
Graves of Billy Clanton and the McLaury brothers

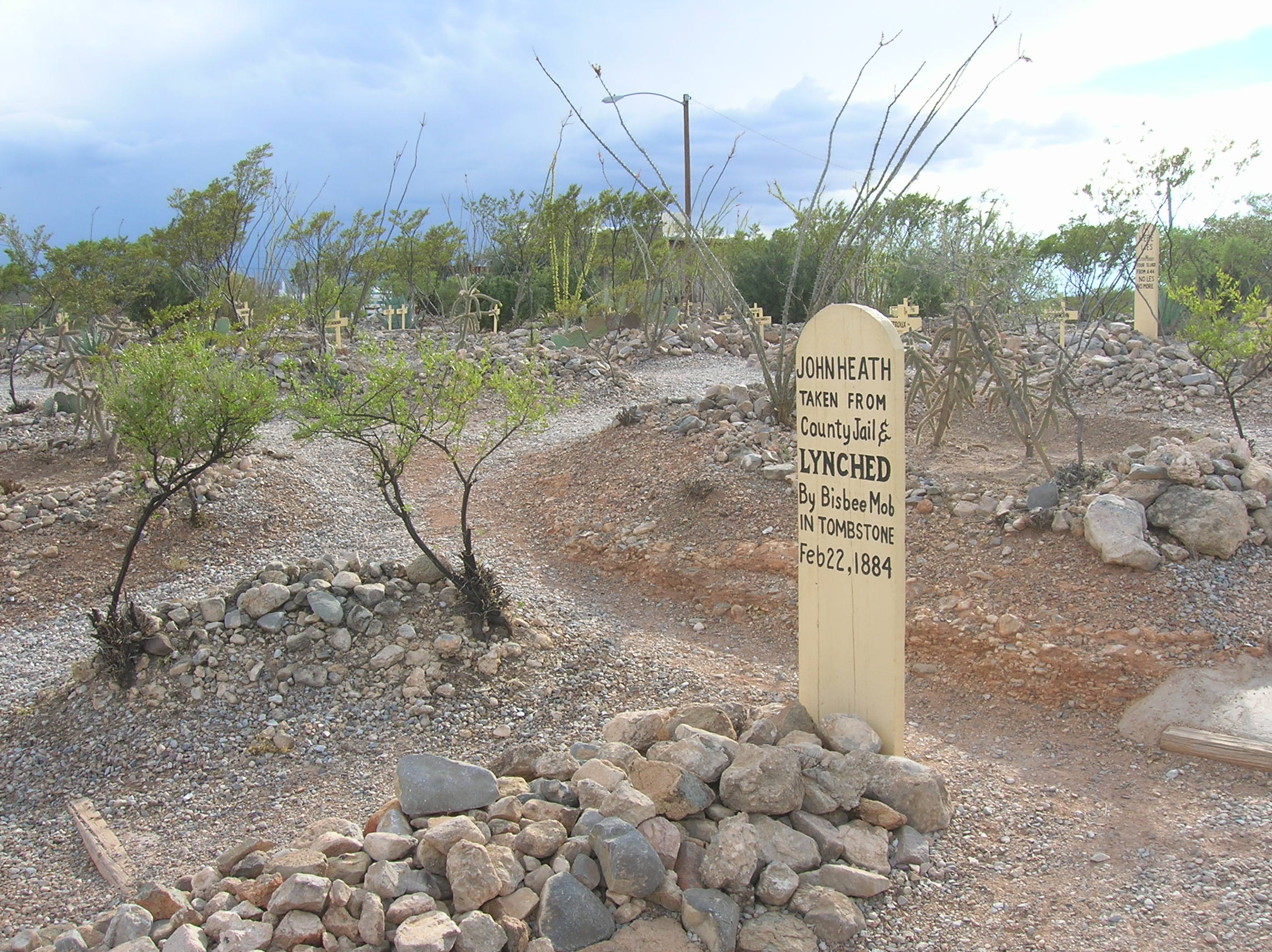
Alleged grave of John Wesley Heath

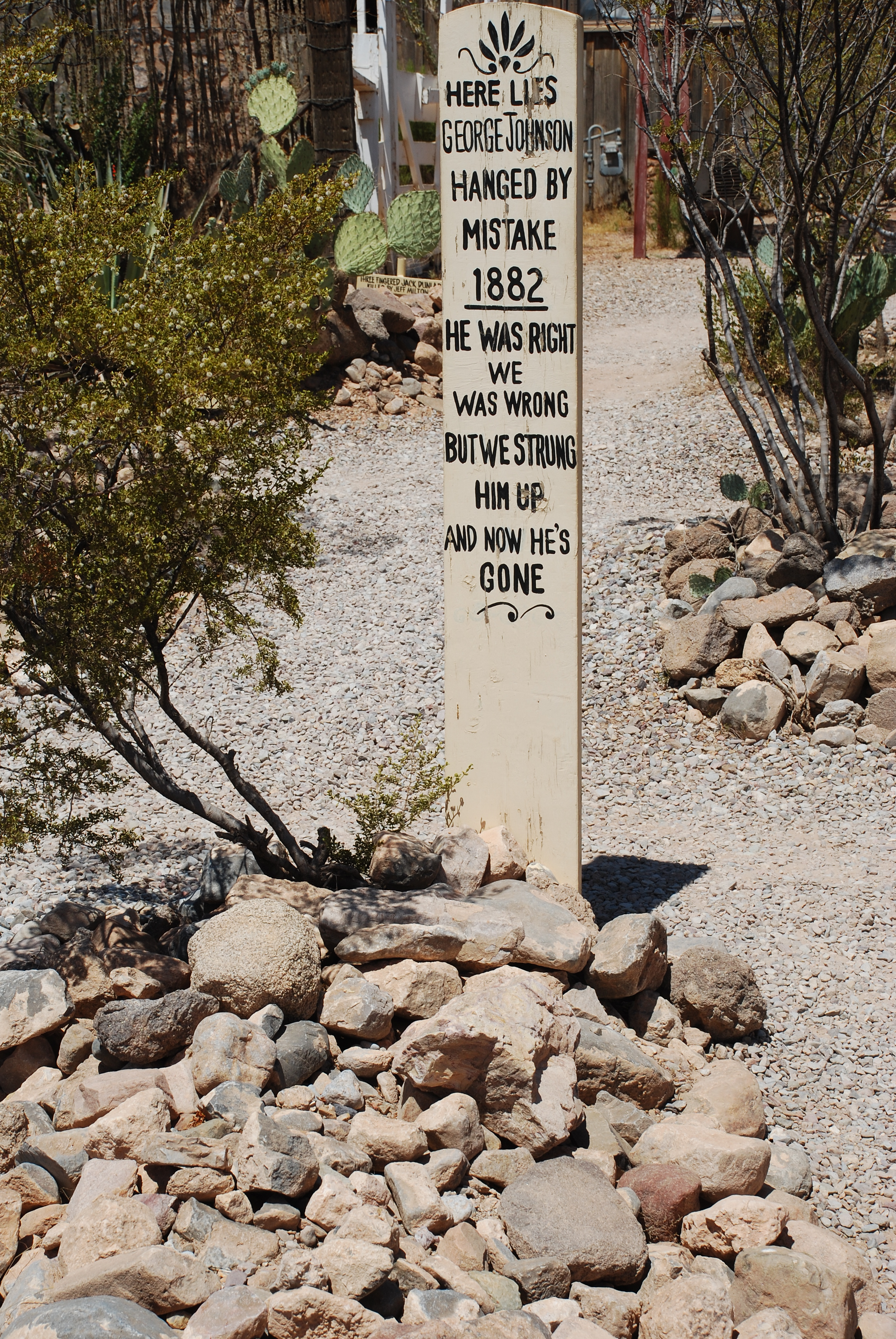
Grave of George Johnson

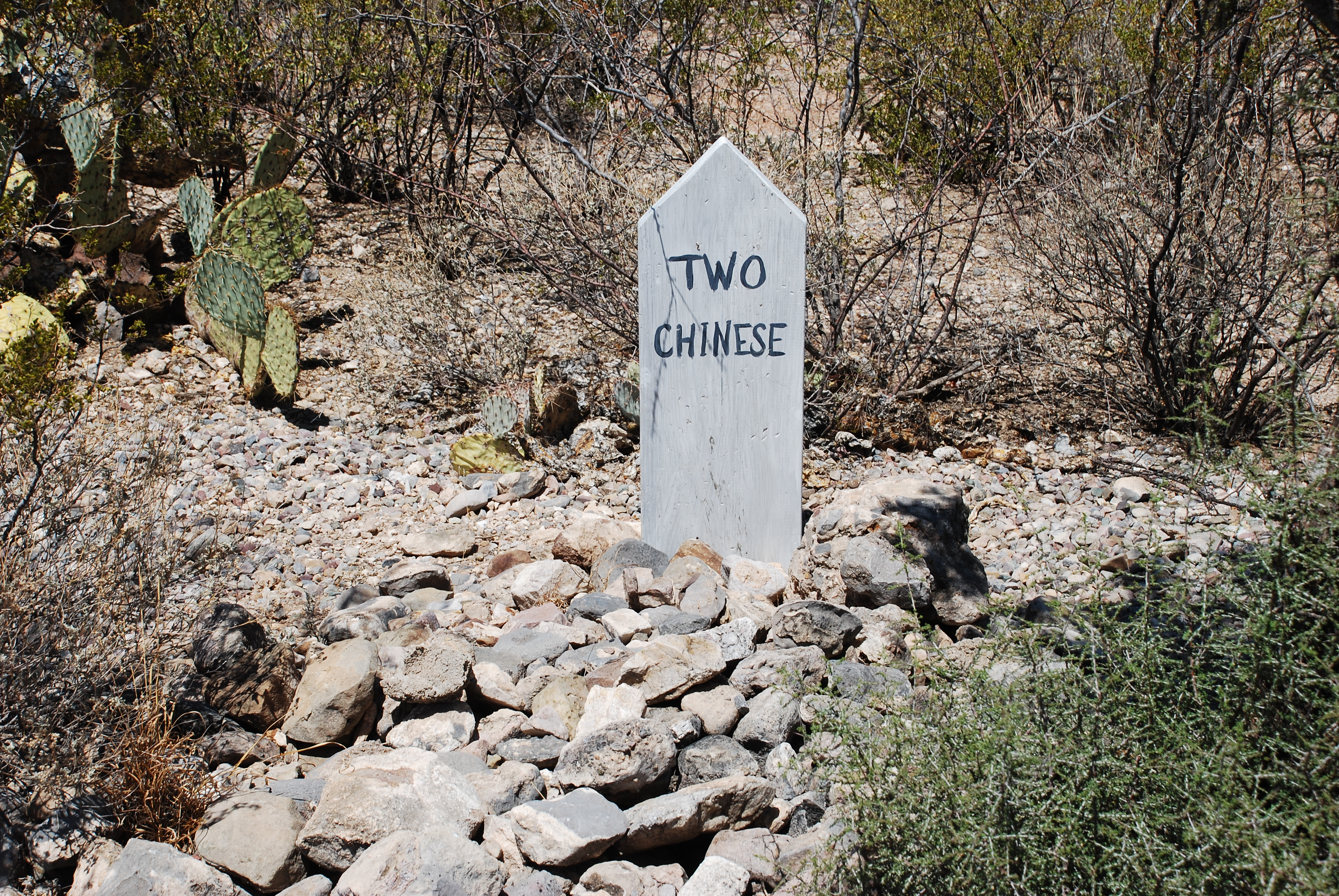
Grave of "Two Chinese"

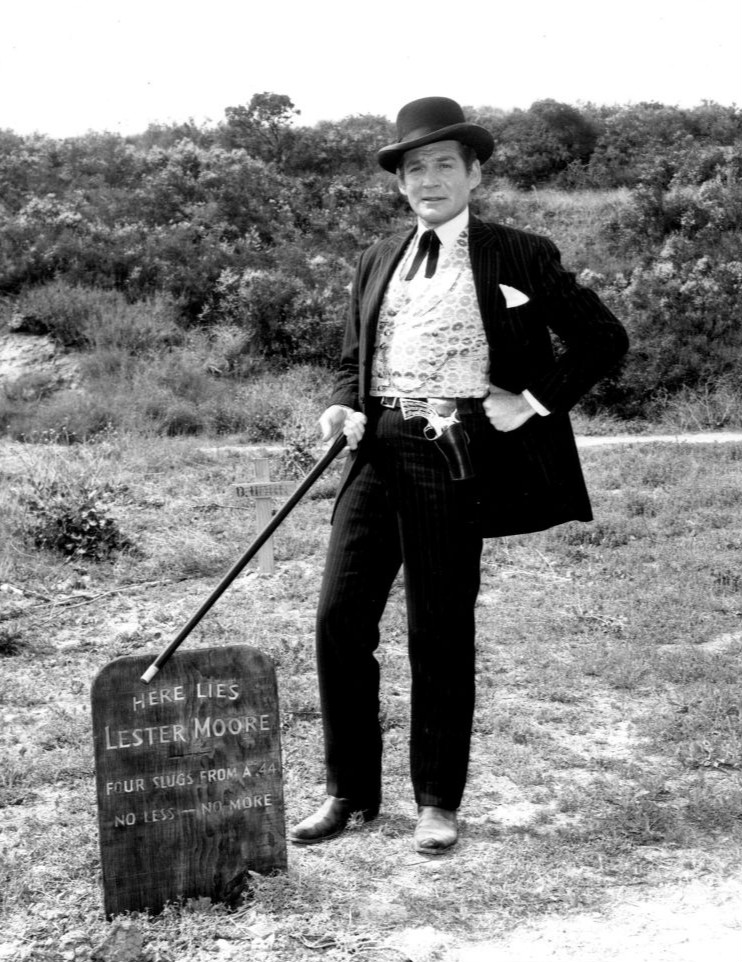
Gene Barry as Bat Masterson standing next to Lester Moore's grave in 1960

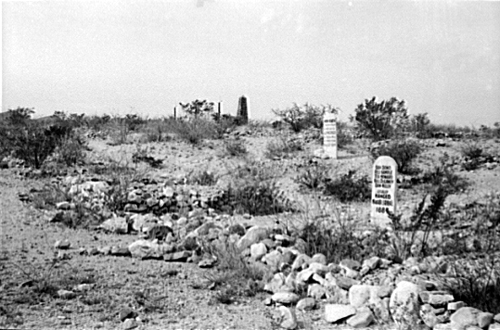
The Boothill Graveyard in 1940

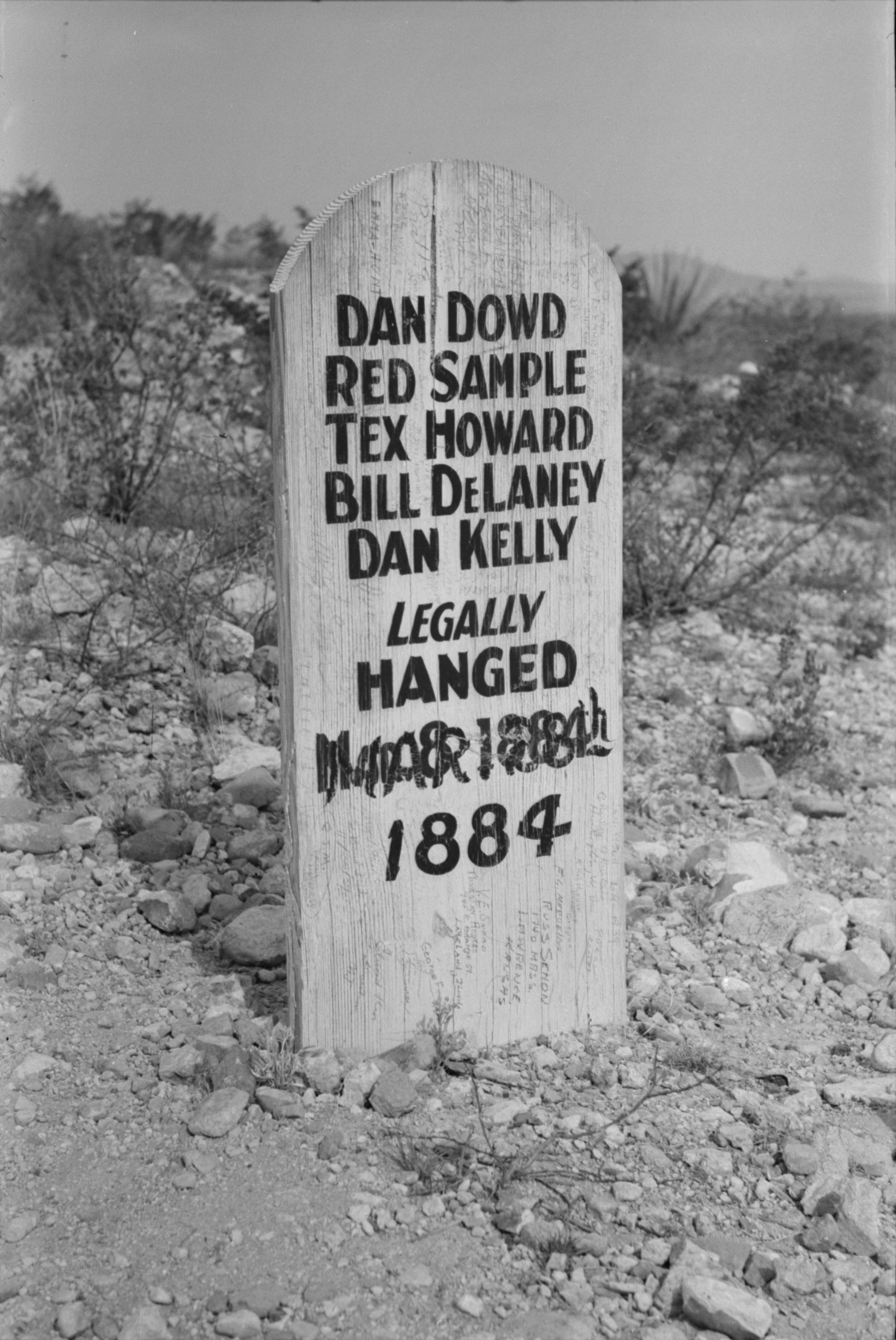
Graves of Dan Dowd, Red Sample, Tex Howard, Bill Delaney and Dan Kelly in 1940

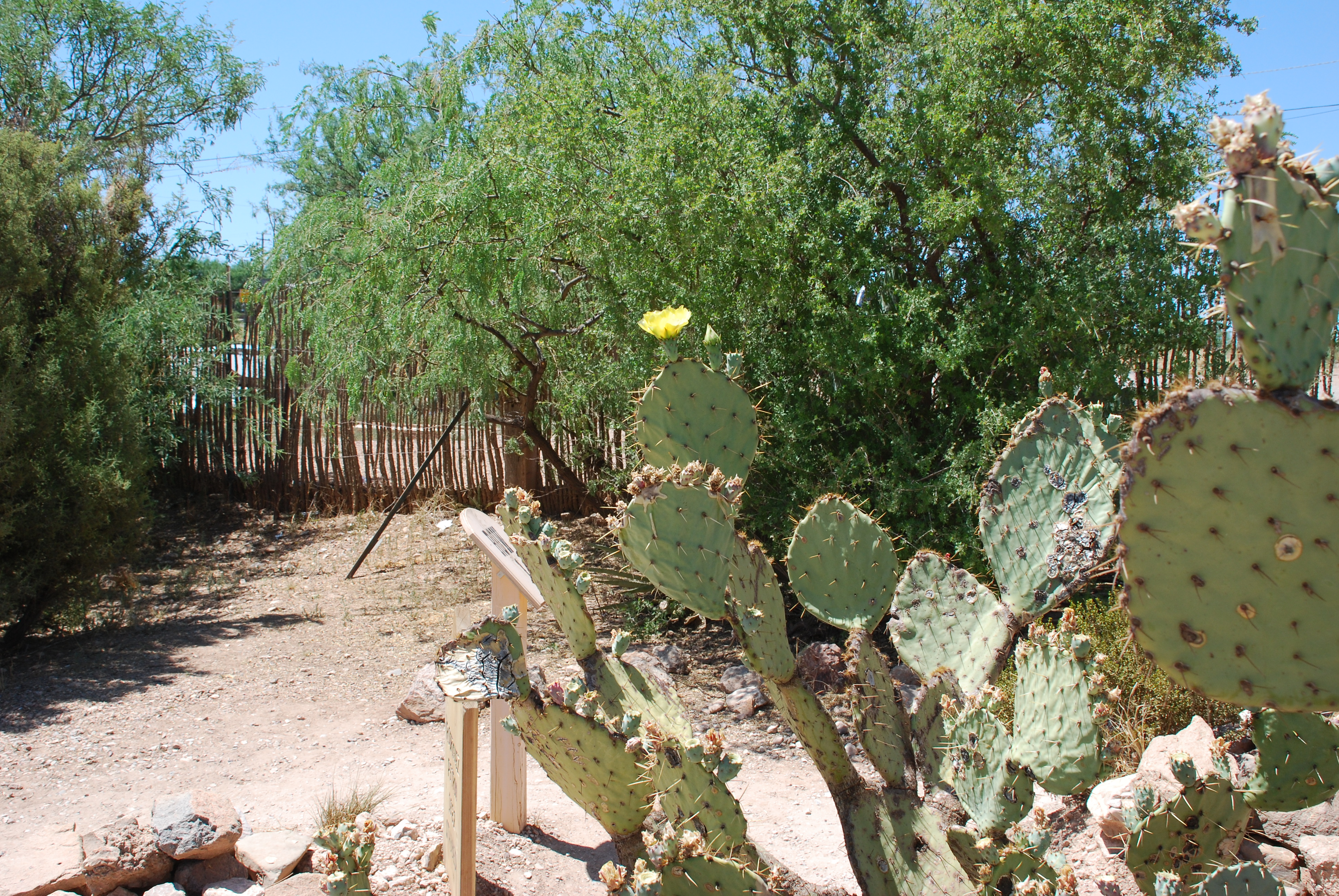
A blooming prickly pear at Boothill Graveyard

=== Deadwood, South Dakota ===
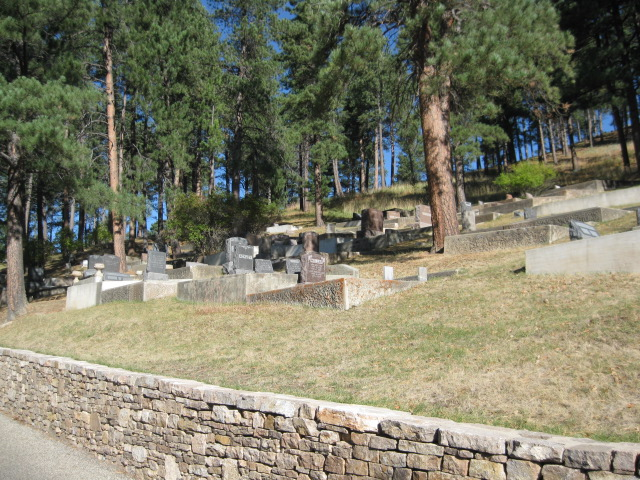
Deadwood's Boot Hill, the Mount Moriah Cemetery

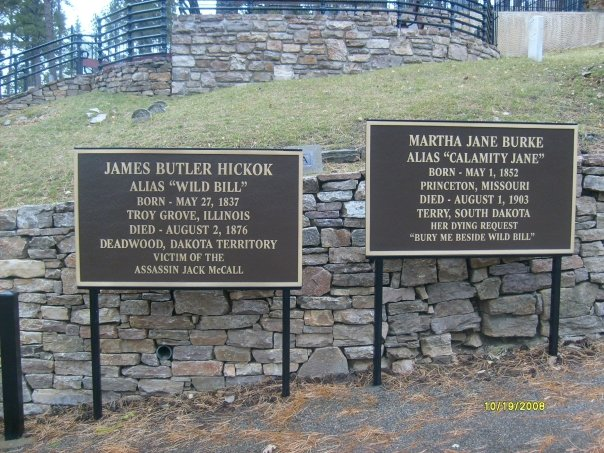
Plaques for Wild Bill Hickok and Calamity Jane

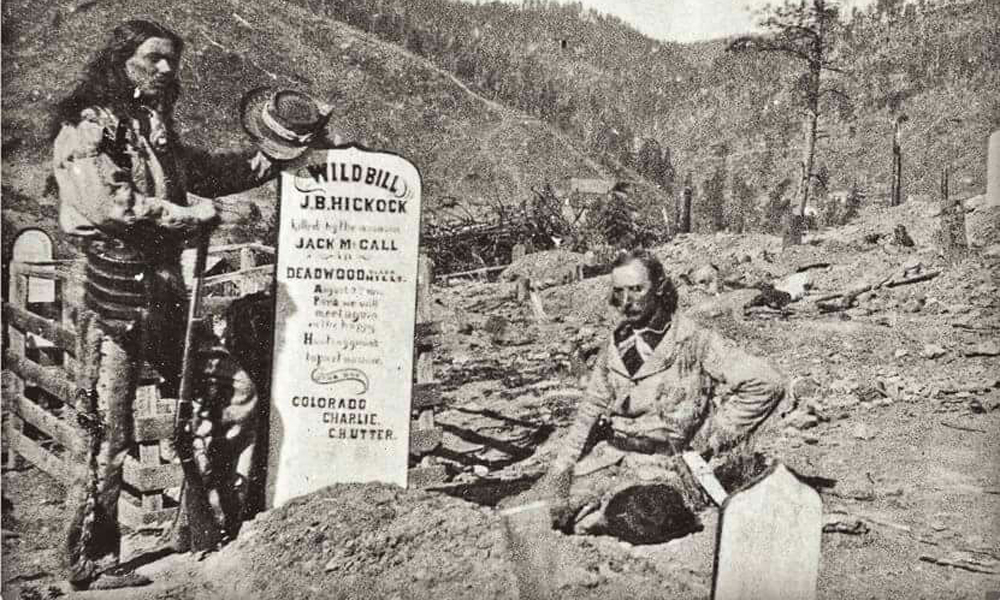
Grave of Wild Bill Hickok

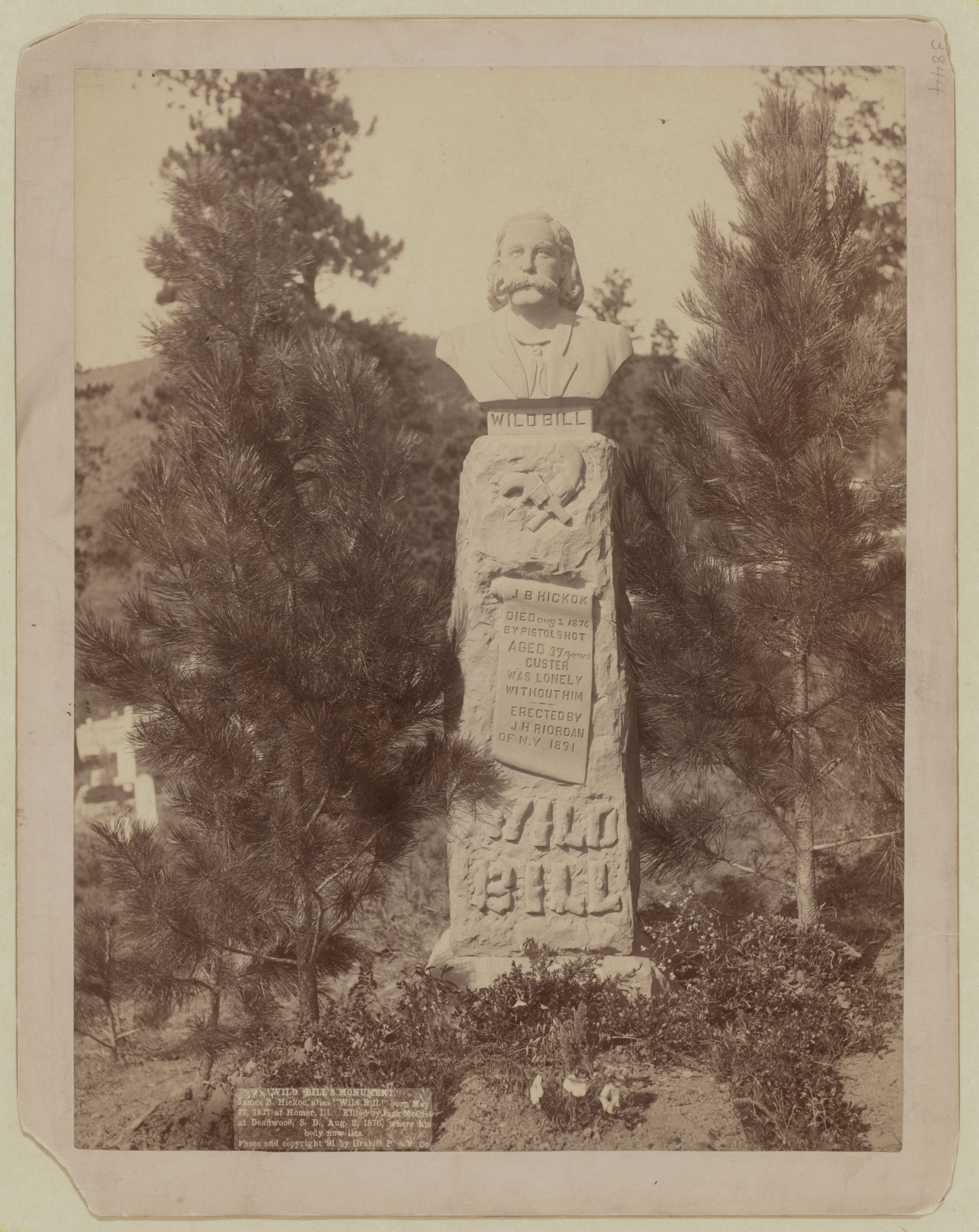
Bust of Wild Bill Hickok in 1891

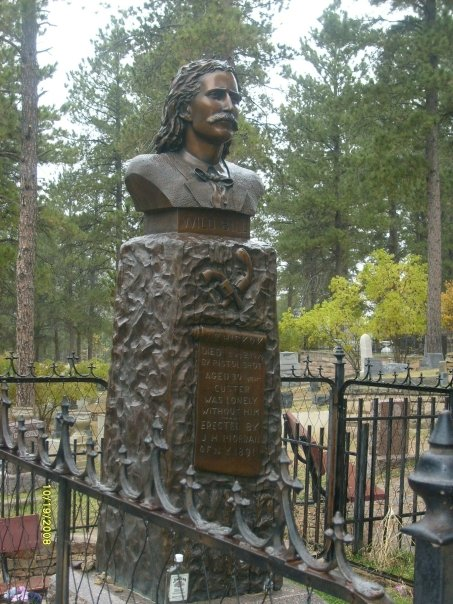
Bust of Wild Bill Hickok

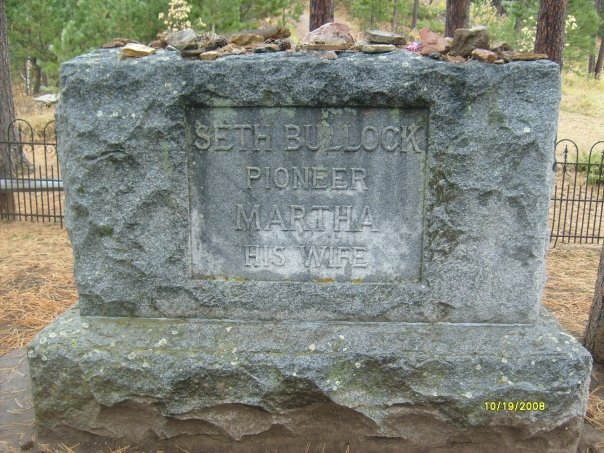
Grave of Seth Bullock and his wife Martha

=== Dodge City, Kansas ===
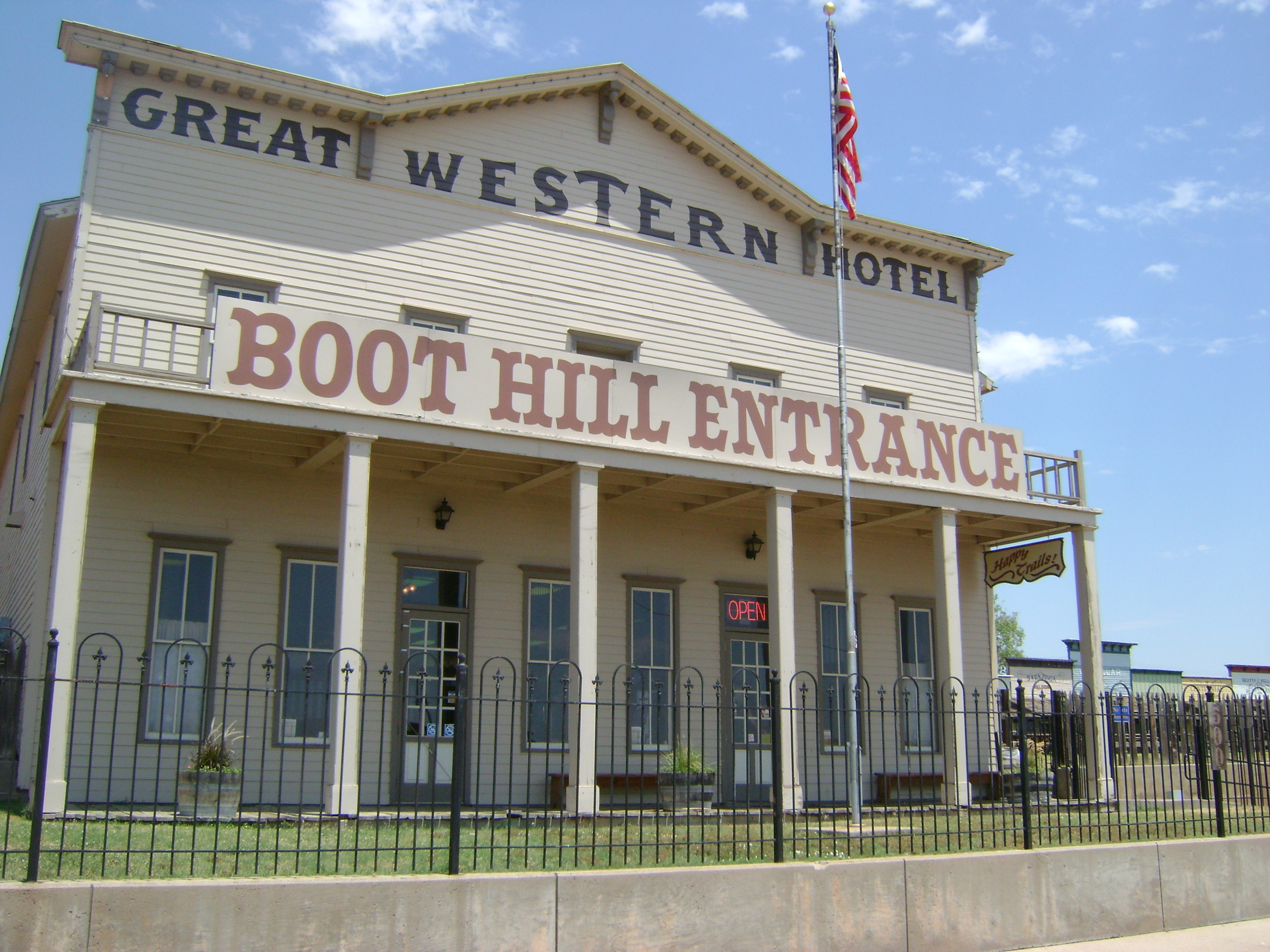
The entrance to the Boot Hill Museum

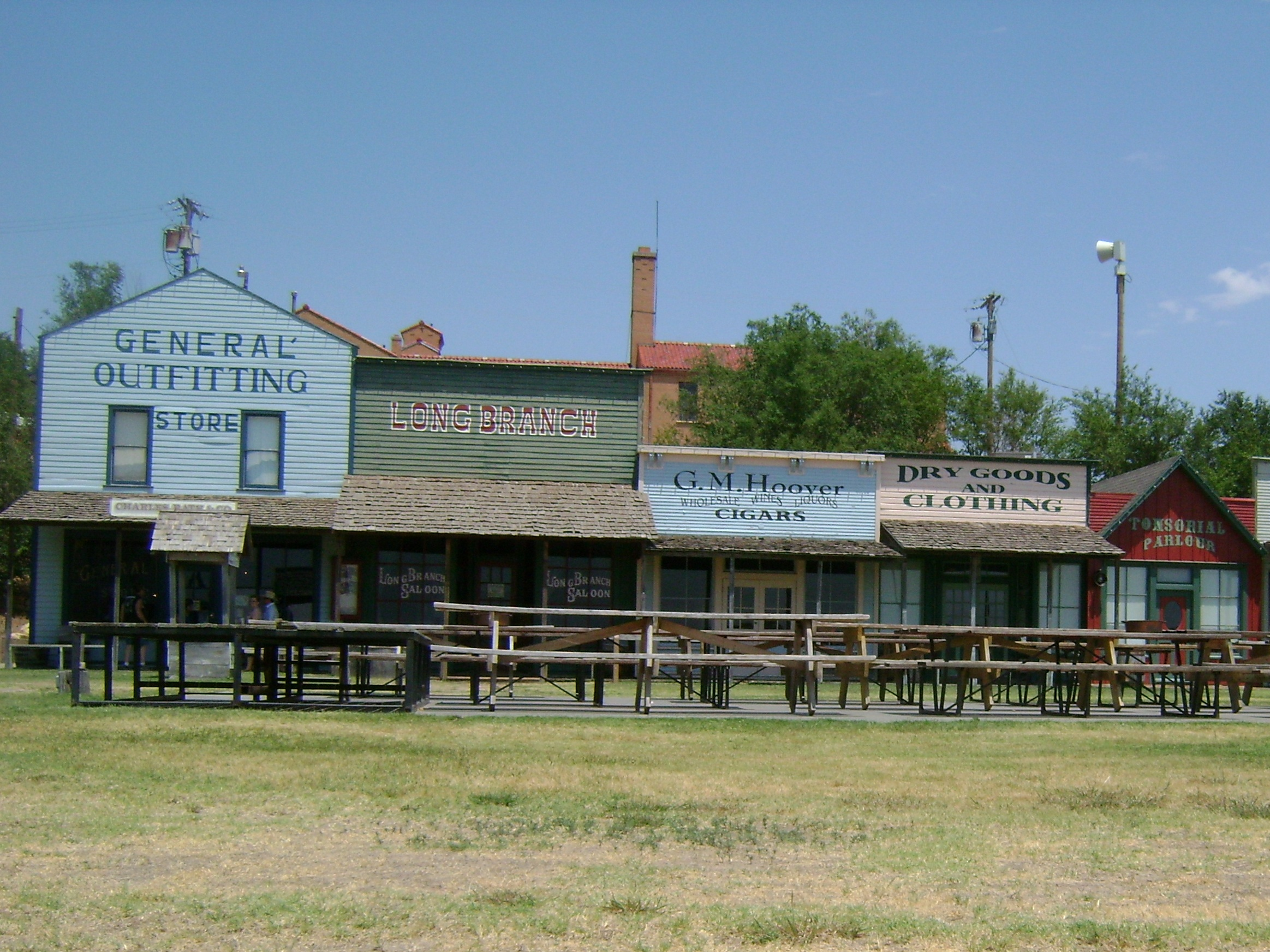
The shops at Boot Hill Museum, including a reconstruction of the Long Branch Saloon

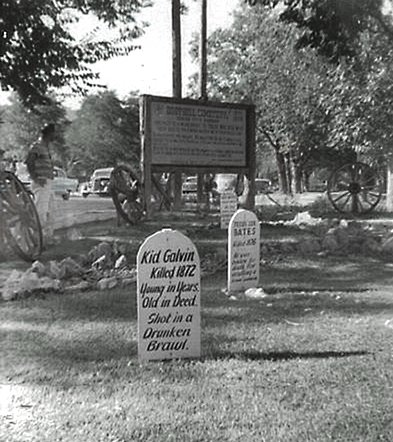
Graves at the Boot Hill Cemetery in 1959

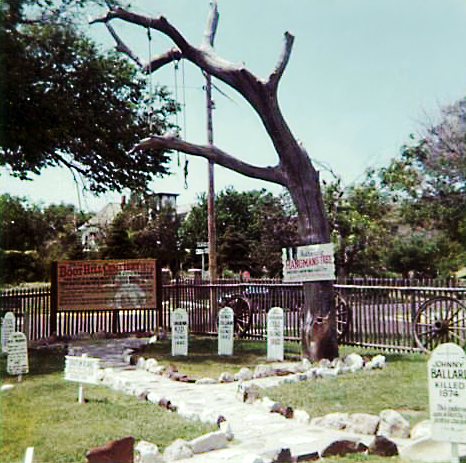
Graves and the Hangman's Tree

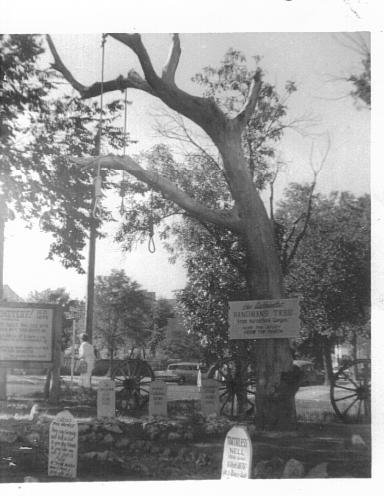
The Hangman's Tree

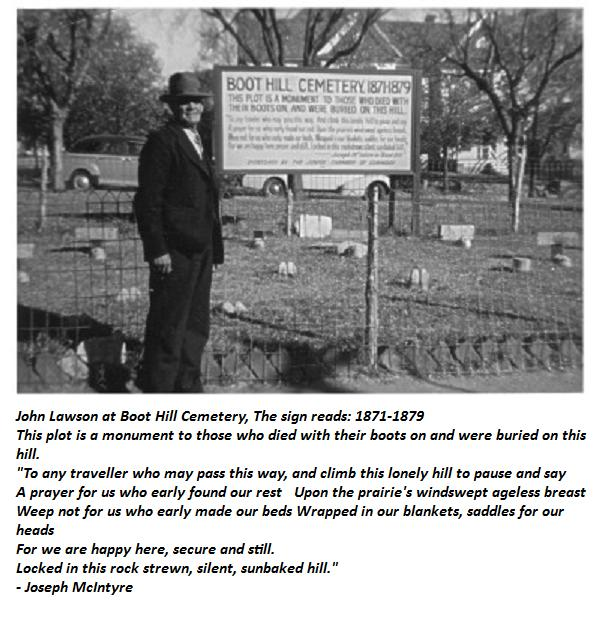
John M Lawson at Boot Hill Cemetery

=== Miscellaneous ===
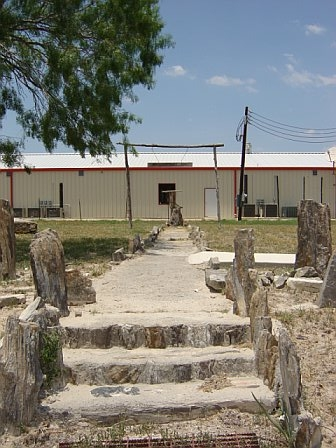
The Boot Hill Cemetery at Tilden, Texas in 2006

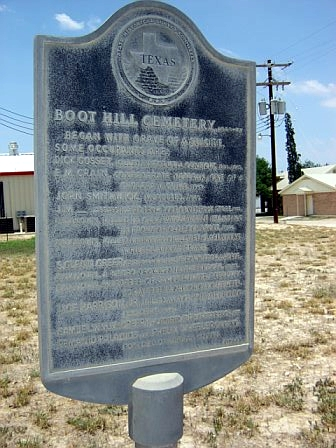
Historical marker in front of the Tilden Boot Hill Cemetery

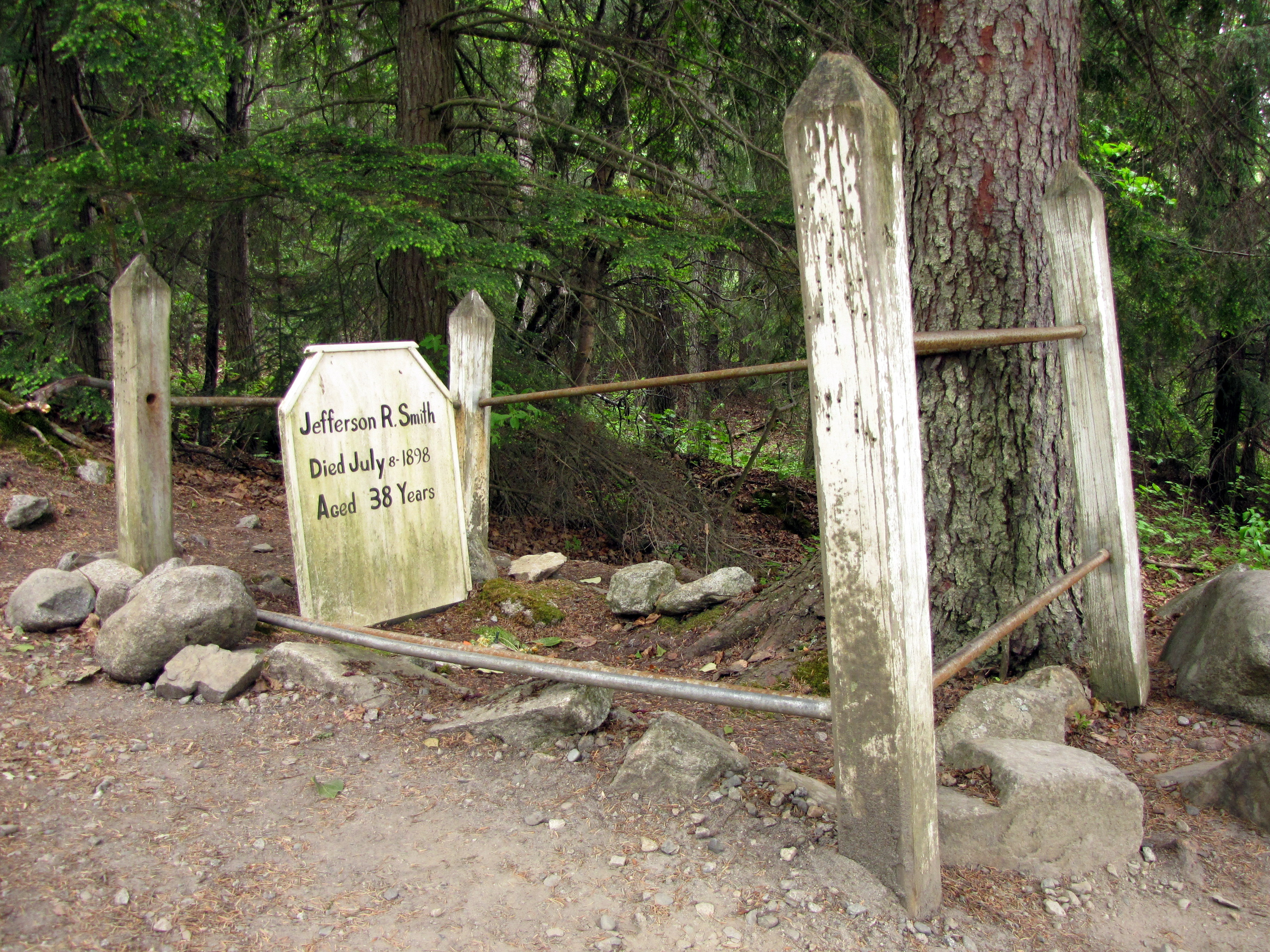
Soapy Smith's grave at the Skagway, Alaska, Boot Hill

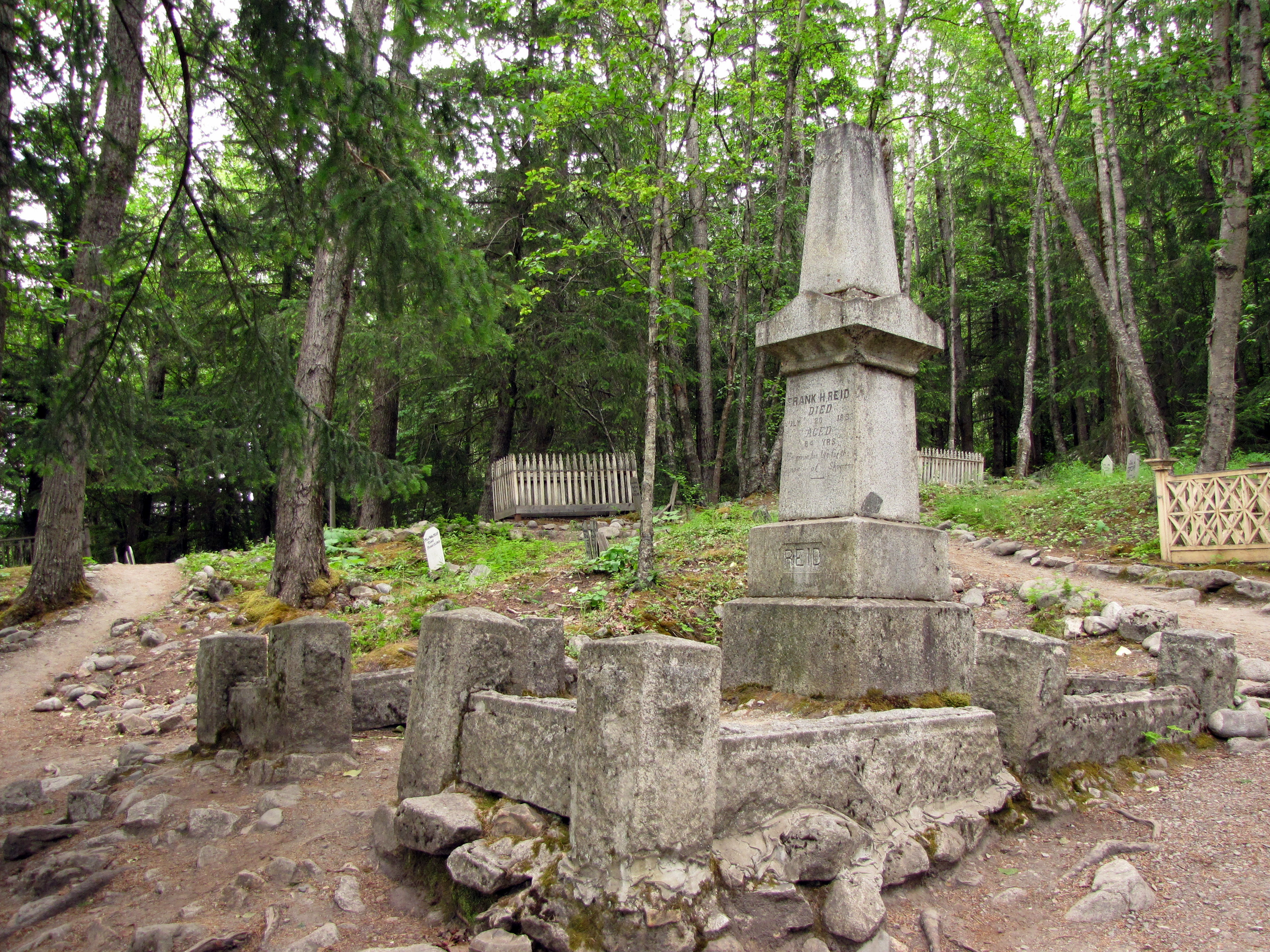
Grave of Frank H. Reid in Skagway

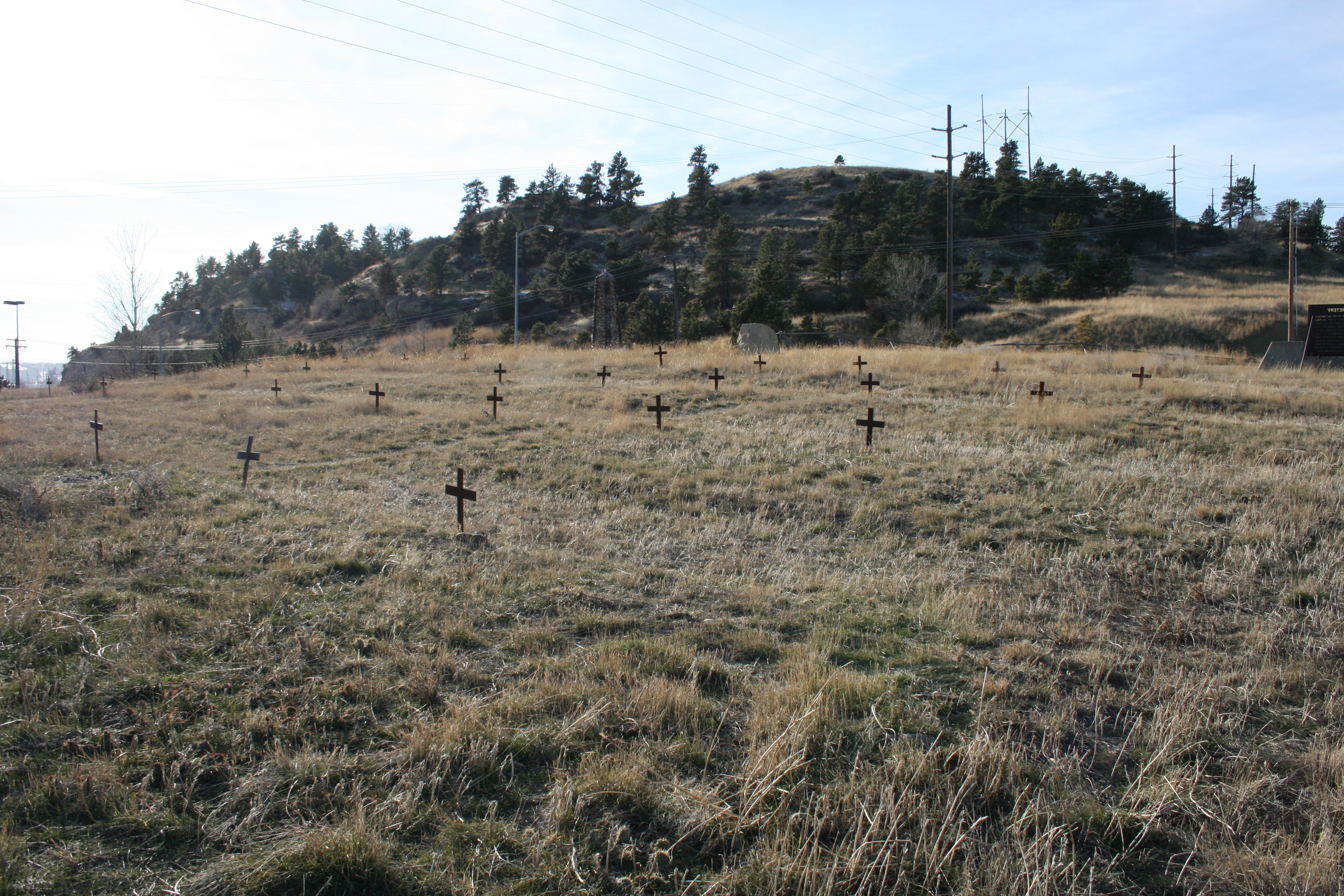
The Boothill Cemetery at Coulson, Montana

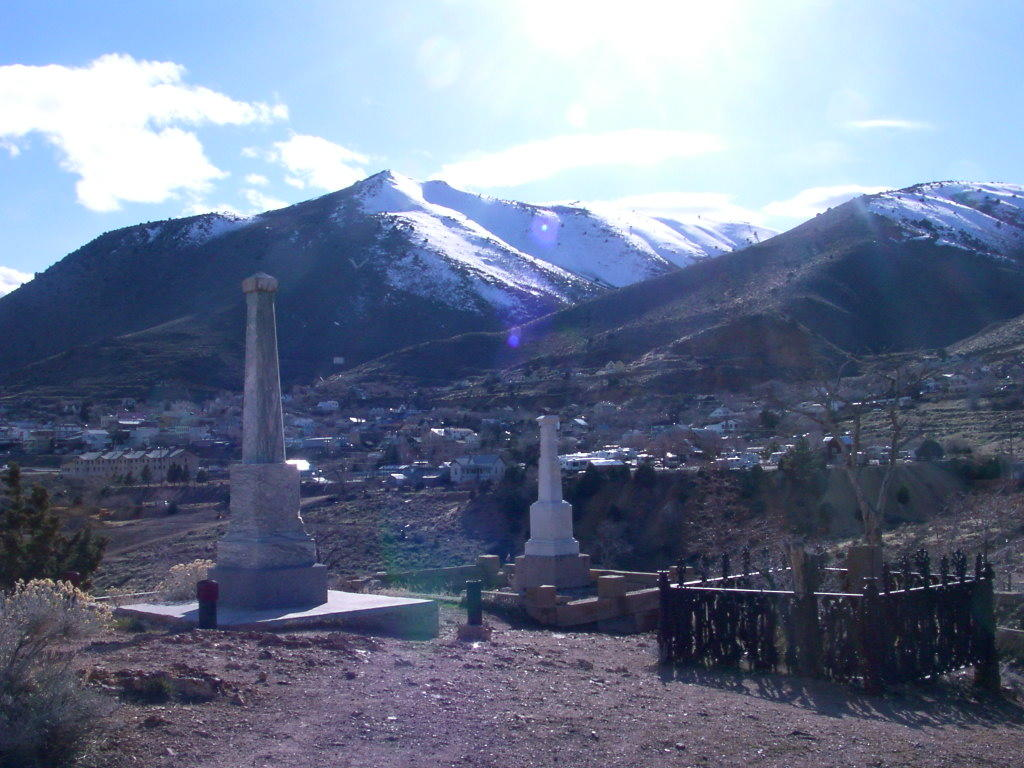
View of Virginia City, Nevada, from Boot Hill

== List of places with Boot Hill cemeteries ==
- Alma, New Mexico
- Anamosa, Iowa
- Billings, Montana
- Bodie, California
- Bonanza, Idaho
- Calabasas, Santa Cruz County, Arizona
- Calico, San Bernardino County, California
- Canyon City, Oregon
- Canyon Diablo, Arizona
- Columbia, California
- Coulson, Montana
- Cripple Creek, Colorado
- Deadwood, South Dakota
- Dodge City, Kansas
- El Paso, Texas
- Fort Sill, Oklahoma
- Guthrie, Oklahoma
- Hartville, Wyoming
- Hays, Kansas
- Idaho City, Idaho
- Leadville, Colorado
- Livermore, California
- Mowry, Arizona
- Newton, Kansas
- Ogallala, Nebraska
- Pioche, Nevada
- Powderville, Montana
- Riley Camp, Quay County, New Mexico
- San Quentin, California
- Seney Township, Michigan
- Sidney, Nebraska
- Silver Reef, Utah
- Skagway, Alaska
- Tascosa, Texas
- Tilden, Texas
- Tincup, Colorado
- Tombstone, Arizona
- Valentine, Nebraska, also known as Minnechaduza Cemetery
- Virginia City, Montana
- Virginia City, Nevada
- Weaver, Arizona
- Prison graveyard at New Westminster, British Columbia.
- Cemetery name given by the prisoners at the Japanese-run Batu Lintang POW and civilian internment camp in Kuching, Sarawak, Borneo during World War II.
- Fictional cemetery at the end of Phantom Manor at Disneyland Paris.

== See also ==
- American Frontier
- Bisbee Massacre
- Cowboy Action Shooting
- Fairbank Train Robbery
- Potter's field
- Shootout at Wilson Ranch
- Shootout on Juneau Wharf
- Western (genre)
- Boot Hill Cemetery
