= Bob Wheeler (politician) =

American politician (1929–2017)

Member of the Texas House of Representatives from the 69th district
- In office January 11, 1955 – January 8, 1957
- In office January 8, 1957 – January 13, 1959
- In office January 13, 1959 – January 10, 1961

Personal details
- Born: November 21, 1929
- Died: May 15, 2017 (aged 87) Tilden, Texas
- Party: Democratic
- Education: University of Texas

Military service
- Branch/service: United States Air Force

Robert Y. Wheeler (November 21, 1929 – April 15, 2017) was a Democratic member of the Texas House of Representatives, representing the 69th District.

== Biography ==
Wheeler was born November 21, 1929. He attended grade school in Tilden, Texas, and attended Texas Military Institute for high school. Following high school, Wheeler served in the US Armed Forces during World War II.

Wheeler earned a Bachelor of Arts degree from the University of Texas in 1950, and a law degree from University of Texas School of Law in 1954. Upon graduation, Wheeler ran for election in the Texas House of Representatives, and served three consecutive terms—from 1955 to 1961—as a Democrat representing the 69th District. Tilden chaired the Public Lands and Buildings committee, and was vice-chair of the Liquor Regulation committee. During his tenure, Wheeler also assisted with his father's ranching business in Tilden.

Wheeler enjoyed travel, and had visited each continent. He died in Tilden on April 15, 2017, and was buried at Hilltop Cemetery in Tilden.
