= McMullen County, Texas =

County in Texas, United States

- County
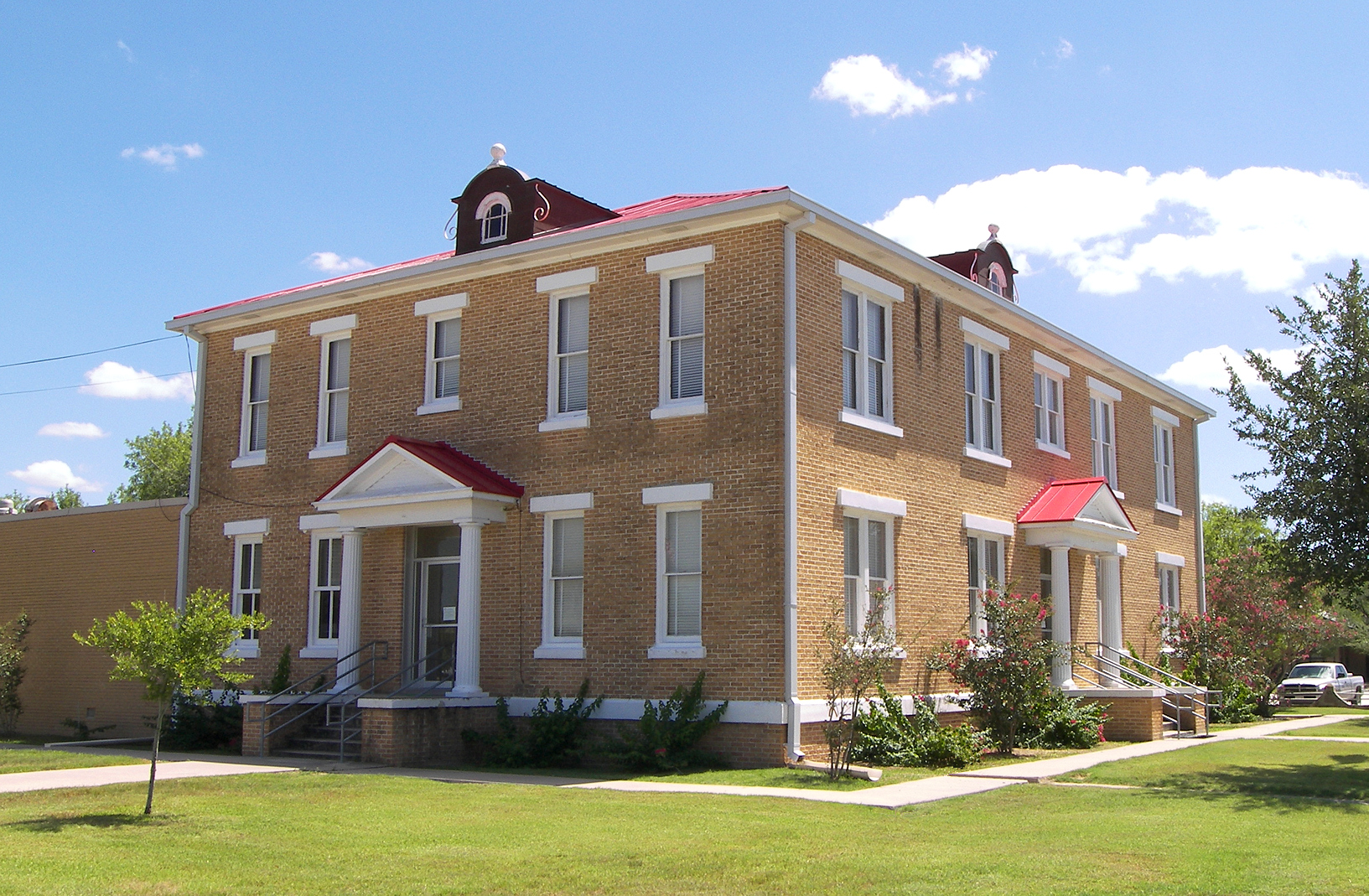
- The McMullen County Courthouse in Tilden

- Location within the U.S. state of Texas
- Coordinates: 28°21′N 98°34′W
- Country: United States
- State: Texas
- Founded: 1877
- Named for: John McMullen
- Seat: Tilden
- Largest community: Tilden

Area
  - Total: 1,157 sq mi (3,000 km^{2})
  - Land: 1,140 sq mi (3,000 km^{2})
  - Water: 17 sq mi (44 km^{2}) 1.5%

Population (2020)
  - Total: 600
  - Estimate (2025): 544 ▼
  - Density: 0.5/sq mi (0.19/km^{2})
- Time zone: UTC−6 (Central)
  - Summer (DST): UTC−5 (CDT)
- Congressional district: 28th
- Website: mcmullencounty.org

McMullen County is a county located in the U.S. state of Texas. As of the 2020 census, its population was 600, making it the fourth-least populous county in Texas. Its county seat is Tilden. The county was established from parts of Bexar County, Atascosa County, and Live Oak County in 1858 and later organized in 1877. It is named for John McMullen, founder of a colony in Texas. The McMullen County Courthouse was designed by architect W.C. Stephenson, originally from Buffalo, New York. Stephenson also designed some 50 buildings in Beeville, including the Bee County Courthouse.

== Geography ==
According to the United States Census Bureau, the county has a total area of 1,157 square miles (3,000 km^{2}), of which 17 square miles (44 km^{2}) (1.5%) are covered by water.

=== Major highways ===
- U.S. Highway 59
- State Highway 16
- State Highway 72
- State Highway 97
- Farm to Market Road 99
- Farm to Market Road 624
- Farm to Market Road 791
- Farm to Market Road 1582

=== Adjacent counties ===
- Atascosa County (north)
- Live Oak County (east)
- Duval County (south)
- La Salle County (west)
- Frio County (northwest)

== Demographics ==
Historical population
Census	Pop.	Note	%±
1870	230		—
1880	701		204.8%
1890	1,038		48.1%
1900	1,024		−1.3%
1910	1,091		6.5%
1920	952		−12.7%
1930	1,351		41.9%
1940	1,374		1.7%
1950	1,187		−13.6%
1960	1,116		−6.0%
1970	1,095		−1.9%
1980	789		−27.9%
1990	817		3.5%
2000	851		4.2%
2010	707		−16.9%
2020	600		−15.1%
2025 (est.)	544	▼	−9.3%
U.S. Decennial Census; 1850–2010 2010-2020

=== Racial and ethnic composition ===
McMullen County, Texas – Racial and ethnic composition Note: the US Census treats Hispanic/Latino as an ethnic category. This table excludes Latinos from the racial categories and assigns them to a separate category. Hispanics/Latinos may be of any race.
Race / Ethnicity (NH = Non-Hispanic)	Pop 1980	Pop 1990	Pop 2000	Pop 2010	Pop 2020	% 1980	% 1990	% 2000	% 2010	% 2020
White alone (NH)	517	493	556	432	353	65.53%	60.34%	65.33%	61.10%	58.83%
Black or African American alone (NH)	0	0	10	8	1	0.00%	0.00%	1.18%	1.13%	0.17%
Native American or Alaska Native alone (NH)	0	3	2	0	1	0.00%	0.37%	0.24%	0.00%	0.17%
Asian alone (NH)	0	0	0	3	3	0.00%	0.00%	0.00%	0.42%	0.50%
Native Hawaiian or Pacific Islander alone (NH)	x	x	0	0	5	x	x	0.00%	0.00%	0.83%
Other race alone (NH)	0	1	0	0	0	0.00%	0.12%	0.00%	0.00%	0.00%
Mixed race or Multiracial (NH)	x	x	1	3	13	x	x	0.12%	0.42%	2.17%
Hispanic or Latino (any race)	272	320	282	261	224	34.47%	39.17%	33.14%	36.92%	37.33%
Total	789	817	851	707	600	100.00%	100.00%	100.00%	100.00%	100.00%

=== 2020 census ===
As of the 2020 census, the county had a population of 600. The median age was 49.2 years. 18.8% of residents were under the age of 18 and 26.8% of residents were 65 years of age or older. For every 100 females there were 100.7 males, and for every 100 females age 18 and over there were 110.8 males age 18 and over.

The racial makeup of the county was 68.5% White, 0.5% Black or African American, 0.2% American Indian and Alaska Native, 0.5% Asian, 0.8% Native Hawaiian and Pacific Islander, 4.2% from some other race, and 25.3% from two or more races. Hispanic or Latino residents of any race comprised 37.3% of the population.

<0.1% of residents lived in urban areas, while 100.0% lived in rural areas.

There were 256 households in the county, of which 37.1% had children under the age of 18 living in them. Of all households, 56.3% were married-couple households, 18.8% were households with a male householder and no spouse or partner present, and 21.1% were households with a female householder and no spouse or partner present. About 23.4% of all households were made up of individuals and 12.5% had someone living alone who was 65 years of age or older.

There were 405 housing units, of which 36.8% were vacant. Among occupied housing units, 71.1% were owner-occupied and 28.9% were renter-occupied. The homeowner vacancy rate was <0.1% and the rental vacancy rate was 2.6%.

=== 2000 census ===
As of the 2000 census, 851 people, 355 households, and 238 families resided in the county. The population density was less than 1/km^{2} (2.6/mi^{2}). The 587 housing units had an average density of 0 units per square mile (0/km^{2}). The racial makeup of the county was 88.37% White, 1.18% African American, 0.24% Native American, 8.93% from other races, and 1.29% from two or more races. About 33.14% of the population were Hispanics or Latinos of any race.

Of the 355 households, 25.9% had children under 18 living with them, 59.7% were married couples living together, 5.6% had a female householder with no husband present, and 32.7% were not families. About 30.7% of all households were made up of individuals, and 14.9% had someone living alone who was 65 or older. The average household size was 2.40 and the average family size was 3.01.

In the county, the age distribution was 23.4% under 18, 6.3% from 18 to 24, 23.7% from 25 to 44, 28.7% from 45 to 64, and 17.9% who were 65 or older. The median age was 43 years. For every 100 females, there were 101.2 males. For every 100 females 18 and over, there were 105.7 males.

The median income for a household in the county was $32,500 and for a family was $35,417. Males had a median income of $26,953 versus $20,982 for females. The per capita income for the county was $22,258. About 20.7% of the population and 15.9% of families were below the poverty line. Of the total people living in poverty, 28.6% were under 18 and 17.9% were 65 or older.

== Education ==
McMullen County is served by the McMullen County Independent School District.

Coastal Bend College (formerly Bee County College) is the designated community college for the county.

== Communities ==
- Calliham
- Tilden (county seat)

== Politics ==
McMullen County is heavily Republican, having only voted for a Democratic candidate once since 1952, when in 1964, Texas native Lyndon B. Johnson won in a national landslide against Republican Barry Goldwater. In 2016, Donald Trump won 91.0% of the vote in McMullen County, the most lopsided result in the county since Franklin D. Roosevelt's victory in 1932. Trump again broke this record in 2024, when he won nearly 92% of the vote in the county.

United States presidential election results for McMullen County, Texas
Year	Republican		Democratic		Third party(ies)	
Year	No.	%	No.	%	No.	%
1912	9	14.52%	50	80.65%	3	4.84%
1916	29	20.14%	115	79.86%	0	0.00%
1920	33	31.13%	72	67.92%	1	0.94%
1924	111	49.78%	109	48.88%	3	1.35%
1928	96	50.00%	94	48.96%	2	1.04%
1932	12	4.44%	258	95.56%	0	0.00%
1936	37	12.25%	265	87.75%	0	0.00%
1940	77	18.64%	336	81.36%	0	0.00%
1944	106	28.27%	223	59.47%	46	12.27%
1948	61	20.20%	222	73.51%	19	6.29%
1952	290	64.88%	156	34.90%	1	0.22%
1956	226	54.72%	185	44.79%	2	0.48%
1960	241	50.10%	240	49.90%	0	0.00%
1964	175	39.50%	267	60.27%	1	0.23%
1968	169	39.49%	160	37.38%	99	23.13%
1972	304	76.77%	88	22.22%	4	1.01%
1976	217	52.80%	194	47.20%	0	0.00%
1980	271	68.09%	122	30.65%	5	1.26%
1984	337	84.67%	61	15.33%	0	0.00%
1988	302	75.88%	94	23.62%	2	0.50%
1992	274	61.85%	78	17.61%	91	20.54%
1996	274	63.72%	117	27.21%	39	9.07%
2000	358	81.55%	77	17.54%	4	0.91%
2004	467	82.80%	95	16.84%	2	0.35%
2008	400	74.49%	132	24.58%	5	0.93%
2012	431	85.69%	67	13.32%	5	0.99%
2016	454	90.98%	40	8.02%	5	1.00%
2020	460	89.15%	53	10.27%	3	0.58%
2024	448	91.99%	37	7.60%	2	0.41%

United States Senate election results for McMullen County, Texas1
Year	Republican		Democratic		Third party(ies)	
Year	No.	%	No.	%	No.	%
2024	423	88.87%	48	10.08%	5	1.05%

United States Senate election results for McMullen County, Texas2
Year	Republican		Democratic		Third party(ies)	
Year	No.	%	No.	%	No.	%
2020	454	90.80%	43	8.60%	3	0.60%

Texas Gubernatorial election results for McMullen County
Year	Republican		Democratic		Third party(ies)	
Year	No.	%	No.	%	No.	%
2022	343	92.20%	28	7.53%	1	0.27%

== See also ==
- List of museums in South Texas
- National Register of Historic Places listings in McMullen County, Texas
- Recorded Texas Historic Landmarks in McMullen County
