= Calliham, Texas =

Unincorporated community in Texas, US

Calliham is an unincorporated community in northeastern McMullen County, Texas, United States, along State Highway 72 between Three Rivers and Tilden. Its elevation is 226 feet (69 m), and it is located at 28°28′50″N 98°21′01″W (28.4805479, -98.3502895). it has a post office with the ZIP code 78007.

== Climate ==
The climate in this area is characterized by hot, humid summers and generally mild to cool winters. According to the Köppen Climate Classification system, Calliham has a humid subtropical climate, abbreviated "Cfa" on climate maps.
