= Tilden, Texas =

Coordinates: 28°27′43″N 98°32′57″W

- County seat and census-designated place
- Hamlet of Tilden
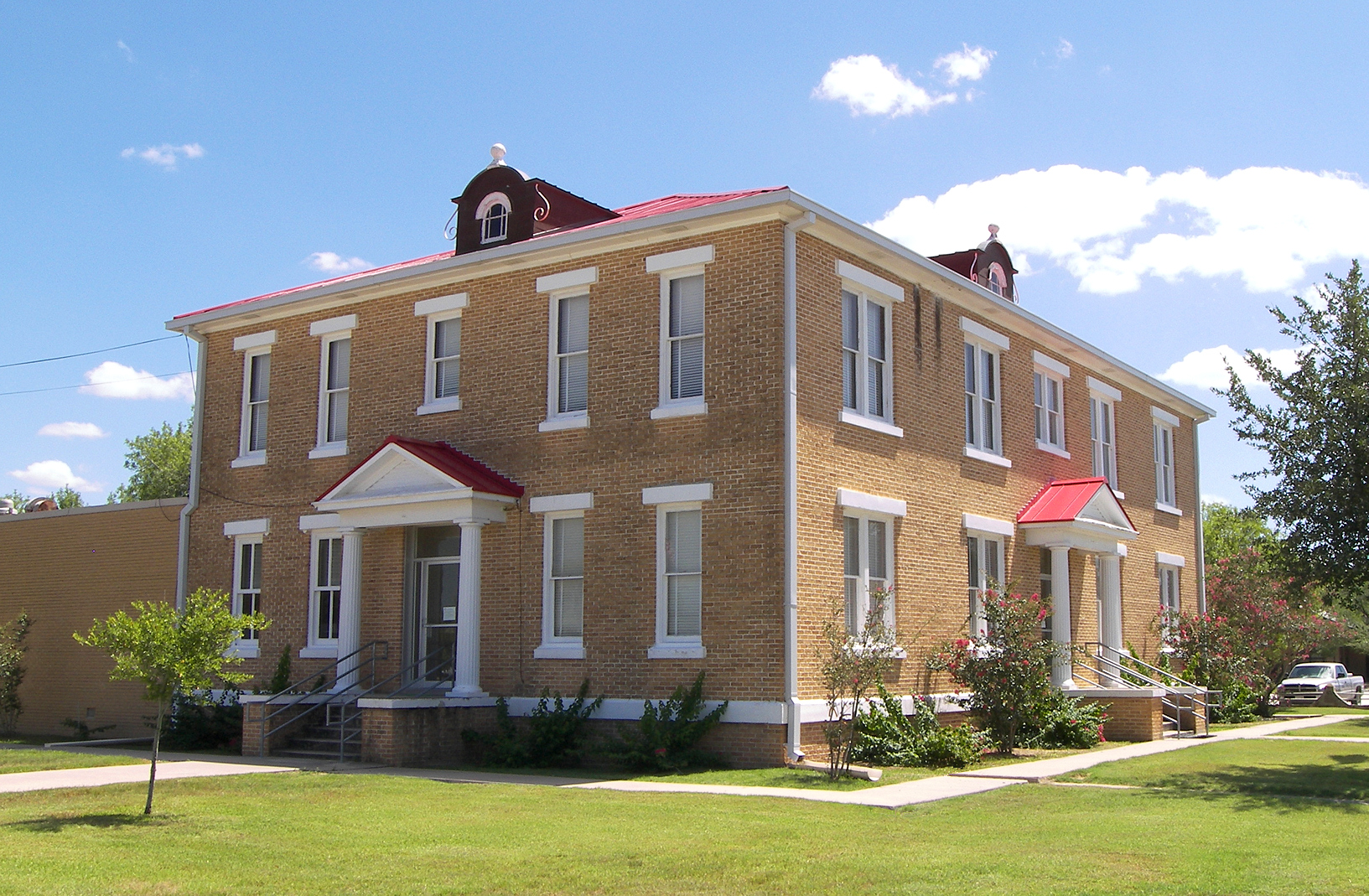
- The McMullen County Courthouse in Tilden

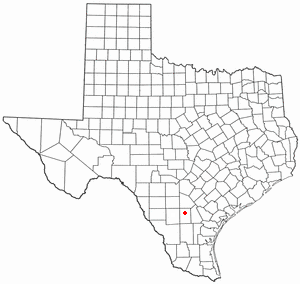
- Location of Tilden, Texas
- Country: United States
- State: Texas
- County: McMullen County

Area
  - Land: 0.35 sq mi (0.91 km^{2})
  - Water: 0 sq mi (0 km^{2})

Population (2020)
  - Total: 190
  - Density: 540/sq mi (210/km^{2})
- Time zone: UTC-6 (CST)
  - Summer (DST): UTC-5 (CDT)
- ZIP Code: 78072

Tilden is an unincorporated community and census-designated place (CDP) in and the county seat of McMullen County, Texas, United States. Its population was 190 at the 2020 census.

Tilden lies at the intersection of State Highways 16 and 72 in the north-central part of the county. It is located about 70 miles south of San Antonio.

== History ==
During the Civil War, a Home Guard post named Camp Rio Frio was built to protect the community from Apaches and bandits. After the war, the community was called Dog Town and was reputed to be a lawless and bandit-filled place. The first establishment was the Franklin Ranch in 1868, built by Ralph S. Franklin. Now the Lone Star Camp, it is a hunting and working ranch camp still owned by the Franklin Family.

In 1871, the community was granted a post office. The town's name was changed in honor of Samuel J. Tilden, the unsuccessful Democratic presidential candidate in the 1876 United States presidential election.

In 1881, Old McMullin College opened under the direction of John Van Epps Covey, and endorsed by the Baptist Church. The buildings were turned over to the Tilden School District in 1897.

== Boot Hill Cemetery ==
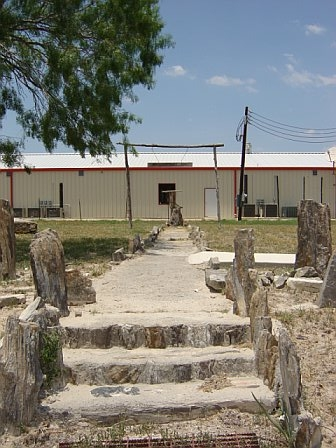
Boot Hill Cemetery after its most recent cleanup, June 2006

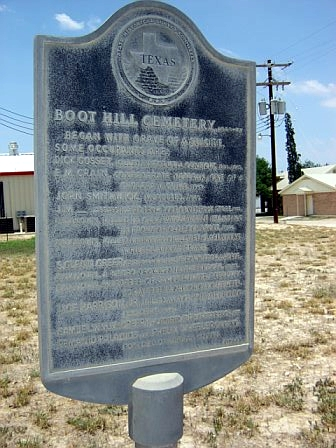
The Historical Marker in front of Boot Hill Cemetery, June 2006

Located in Tilden, Boot Hill Cemetery is one of the only two authentic cemeteries of its kind in the southwest. It was so named because many of those who were interred there died violently ("with their boots on"). Many of the early graves were those of people who were killed in accidents, murdered, or who died of cholera during an epidemic in 1869, although some were known to have died of natural causes. The cemetery was established sometime after Frio Rio came into existence in 1858. It is currently located behind the bank half a block north of the courthouse plaza on Highway 72 and half a block east of State Highway 16, across from the new sheriff's office.

In 1877, Boot Hill Cemetery was abandoned in favor of the present Hill Top Cemetery and then neglected for more than half a century. During this time, a number of the markers deteriorated, fell down, and became lost, along with the local history they contained. In 1955, when the Cenizo Garden Club was organized, its members began to clean up and restore the cemetery. They cleaned the plots, cleared out the brush, and located as many graves as possible. The grounds were enclosed by a low border of native stone and the Boot Hill Cemetery sign, a large boot made of masonry mounted on a large slab of petrified palm stump, was added to the cemetery grounds. The club was also instrumental in obtaining a historical marker, which now stands at the entrance to the cemetery.

== Demographics ==
Historical population
Census	Pop.	Note	%±
2010	261		—
2020	190		−27.2%
U.S. Decennial Census; 1850–1900 1910; 1920 1930 1940; 1950 1960 1970; 1980 1990 2000; 2010 2020

Tilden first appeared as a census designated place in the 2010 U.S. census.

Tilden CDP, Texas – Racial and ethnic composition Note: the US Census treats Hispanic/Latino as an ethnic category. This table excludes Latinos from the racial categories and assigns them to a separate category. Hispanics/Latinos may be of any race.
Race / Ethnicity (NH = Non-Hispanic)	Pop 2010	Pop 2020	% 2010	% 2020
White alone (NH)	128	62	49.04%	32.63%
Black or African American alone (NH)	8	0	3.07%	0.00%
Native American or Alaska Native alone (NH)	0	1	0.00%	0.53%
Asian alone (NH)	0	1	0.00%	0.53%
Native Hawaiian or Pacific Islander alone (NH)	0	2	0.00%	1.05%
Other race alone (NH)	0	0	0.00%	0.00%
Multiracial (NH)	0	7	0.00%	3.68%
Hispanic or Latino (any race)	125	117	47.89%	61.58%
Total	261	190	100.00%	100.00%

As of the 2020 United States census, 190 people, 72 households, and 56 families resided in the CDP.

== Education ==
Public education in the community of Tilden is provided by the McMullen County Independent School District.

== Notable people ==
- Lon Oden (1863–1910), was a Texas Ranger of the Old West, and a legend inside the Rangers.
- Bob Wheeler was a member of Texas State Legislature from 1955 to 1961.

== Climate ==
The climate in this area is characterized by hot, humid summers and generally mild to cool winters. According to the Köppen climate classification, Tilden has a humid subtropical climate, Cfa on climate maps.
