= ITC =

ITC may stand for:

== Companies ==
- Illinois Terminal Company, US railroad, reporting mark
- Information Terminals Corporation, predecessor to Verbatim Corporation
- Intelligence Technology Corporation, US computer company
- International Typeface Corporation, now a subsidiary of Monotype Imaging
- Ishikawa TV, a Japanese commercial broadcaster
- ITC Limited, formerly Indian Tobacco Company, India
  - ITC Hotels
- ITC or ITC Entertainment, British TV company
- ITC Transmission, electric transmission company, Michigan, USA

== Organizations ==
- Committee of Union and Progress (İttihad ve Terakki Cemiyeti), Turkish political party
- Independent Transport Commission, UK research charity
- Intechcentras, Lithuanian competence center for digitisation and innovative manufacturing practices
- International Test Commission, Association to promote effective psychological testing and assessment policies
- International Tin Council, former organisation for tin producers in Cornwall and Malaysia
- International Trade Centre, a joint agency of the WTO and the UN
- Israel Tennis Centers, a nonprofit running tennis courts in Israel
- United States International Trade Commission, federal agency of the United States

== Science ==
- Indirect-threaded code, a compiler implementation technique
- Intercalated cells of the amygdala, a group of GABAergic neurons in the amygdala
- International Teletraffic Congress, a communications research and collaboration group
- Intertropical Convergence Zone (abbreviated ITC or ITCZ)
- Isothermal titration calorimetry, analytical physical chemistry technique
- Isothiocyanate, a chemical group found in compounds that contribute to a healthy diet

== Education and research ==
- Illinois Technical College, a private junior college in Chicago, Illinois from 1950 to 1992
- Institute of Technology of Cambodia, located in Phnom Penh, Cambodia
- Institute of Technology, Carlow, a Regional Technical College, located south of Carlow, Ireland
- Institute of Texan Cultures, a museum and library located in HemisFair Park in downtown San Antonio, Texas
- Instituto Tecnológico de Córdoba, an organization promoting technological development in Córdoba, Argentina
- International Teledemocracy Centre, part of Edinburgh Napier University, dedicated to researching e-participation and e-democracy systems
- ITC Enschede, the International Institute for Geoinformation Science and Earth Observation, a tertiary educational institution located in Enschede, Netherlands
- ITC Sangeet Research Academy, a Hindustani classical music academy run by ITC Limited, located in Kolkata, India
  - ITC SRA Sangeet Sammelan, an annual Indian classical music festival

== Religion and theology ==
- Interdenominational Theological Center, a consortium of denominational seminaries located in Atlanta, Georgia
- International Teaching Centre, an appointed body of the Bahá'í Administrative Order located at the Bahá'í World Centre in Haifa
- International Theological Commission, a group of Roman Catholic theologians

== Sport ==
- International Touring Car Championship, the 1995/1996 version of the Deutsche Tourenwagen Meisterschaft
- The International Technical Committee of the Offshore Racing Congress

== Other uses ==
- Independent Television Commission, UK TV regulator 1991-2003
- Interagency Training Center, a U.S. National Security Agency facility
- Instrumental transcommunication, a form of Electronic voice phenomena (EVP)
- Investment tax credit, a refundable tax incentive
- ITC building in 2002 Ho Chi Minh City ITC fire
