= Intech =

Intech may refer to:

- Winchester Science Centre, an educational science and technology centre known as INTECH until 2013
- Lincoln InTech engine, a branded version of the Ford Modular engine
- Intech Contracting
- IDBI Intech Ltd
- InTech Collegiate Academy
- Intechcentras – Lithuanian competence centre for digitisation and innovative manufacturing practices

== See also ==
- Intec (disambiguation)
