= Harbor Bridge Project =

Bridge project in Corpus Christi, Texas, US

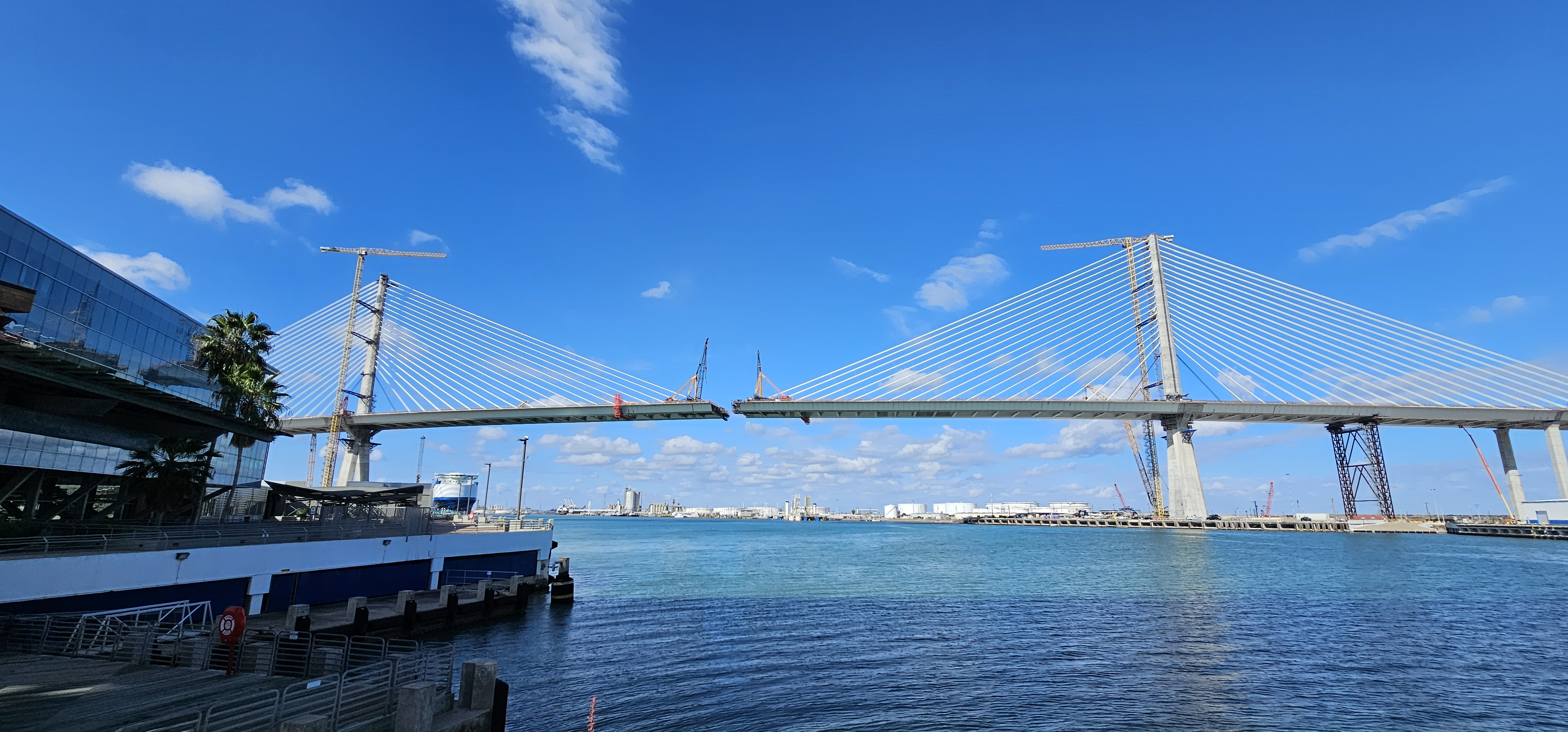
- The replacement Corpus Christi Harbor Bridge under construction, photographed in 2024
- Coordinates: 27°48′48.55″N 97°23′56.22″W
- Carries: 6 lanes of US 181; bicycle/pedestrian shared path
- Crosses: Corpus Christi Ship Channel
- Locale: Corpus Christi, Texas
- Website: harborbridgeproject.com

Characteristics
- Design: Cable-stayed bridge
- Material: Post-tensioned concrete
- Total length: 3,295 ft (1,004 m) (main span unit); 10,820 ft (3,298 m) (total length with approaches)
- Width: 134 ft (41 m)
- Height: 538 ft (164 m)
- Longest span: 1,661 ft (506 m)
- Clearance below: 205 ft (62 m)
- Design life: 170 years

History
- Engineering design by: FIGG Bridge Engineers; Arup-CFC
- Constructed by: Flatiron/Dragados
- Construction start: August 8, 2016
- Construction end: July 8, 2025
- Construction cost: $1.3 billion
- Opened: June 28, 2025
- Replaces: Corpus Christi Harbor Bridge

Location
- Interactive map of Harbor Bridge Project

The Harbor Bridge Project (or New Harbor Bridge or US 181 Harbor Bridge) is the replacement of the former through arch bridge that crosses the Corpus Christi Ship Channel, which serves the Port of Corpus Christi in Corpus Christi, Texas,The new Harbor Bridge solidifies Corpus Christi’s position as a global energy hub, home to the Port of Corpus Christi, the nation’s largest crude oil export gateway and the third largest in the world, said Corpus Christi Mayor Paulette Guajardo, with a modern cable-stayed bridge design. The route connects with SH 286 (the Crosstown Expressway) at its southern terminus and US 181 on the north. Groundbreaking on construction took place on August 8, 2016 and was scheduled to be completed by the spring of 2020, but was extensively delayed by engineering and design issues. It finally opened to traffic on June 28, 2025. Demolition of the old bridge began in November 2025.Demolition of the old bridge began in October 27, 2025.

== History ==
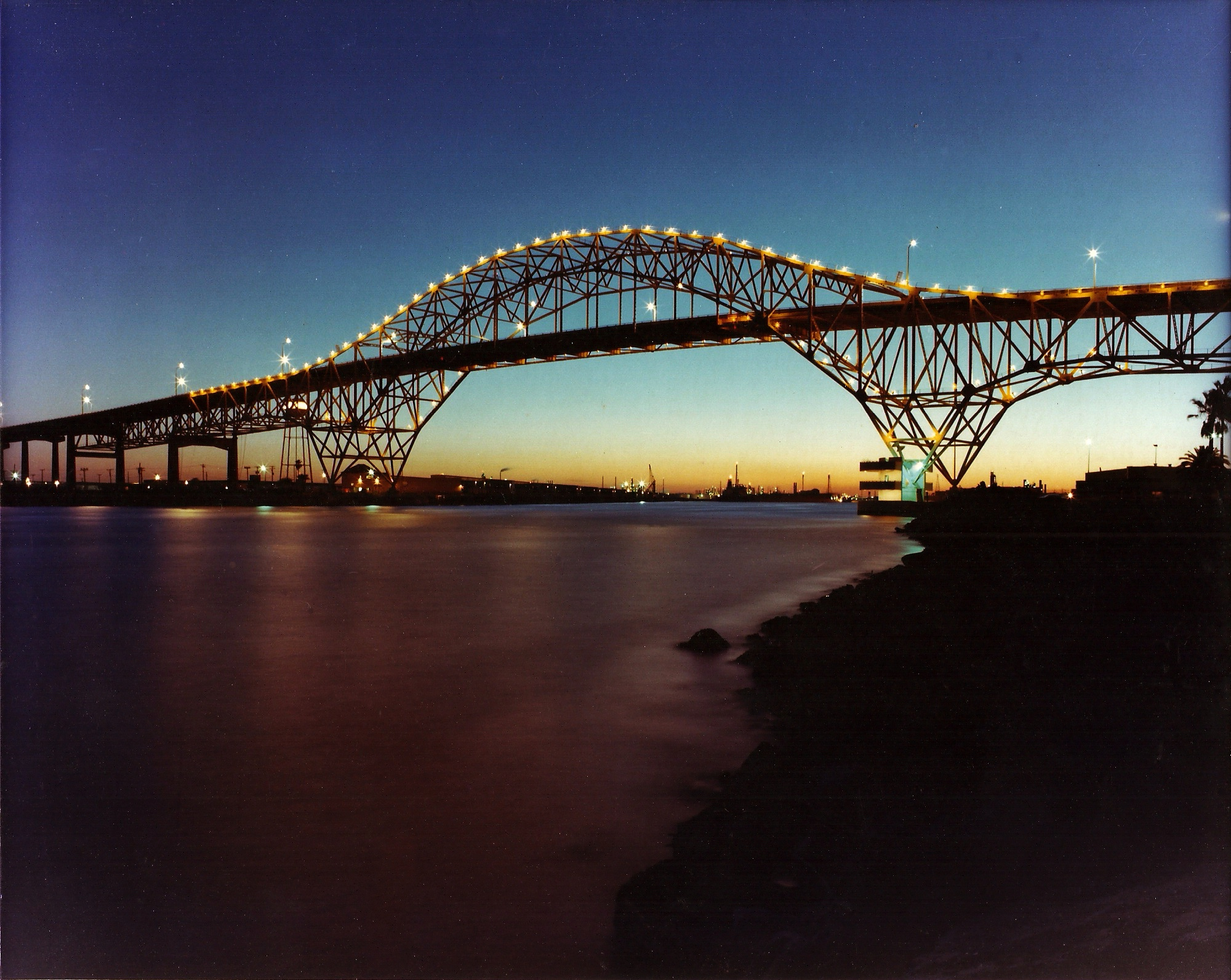
The through-arch Corpus Christi Harbor Bridge at dusk, 1988

Planning for the bridge began in 2003 to address the maintenance and safety issues of the existing Corpus Christi Harbor Bridge as well as provide long term access to the Port of Corpus Christi to larger ship vessels (including Panamax). Texas Department of Transportation (TxDOT) awarded developer Flatiron/Dragados with the design–build contract for the project.

== Design ==
The new design is a cable-stayed bridge made up of twin precast concrete delta frame segmental box girders that spans 1,661 feet (506 m) across the entire ship channel bank-to-bank, providing 205 feet (62 m) of clearance above the water. The twin parallel cable-stays are arranged in a fan along middle of the mixed-use deck 134 feet (41 m) wide that carry six lanes of US 181 and a bicycle and pedestrian path with a mid-span belvedere facing the Corpus Christi Bay. The approaches are of the same box girder type supported by columns 180 feet (55 m) apart.

== Construction ==
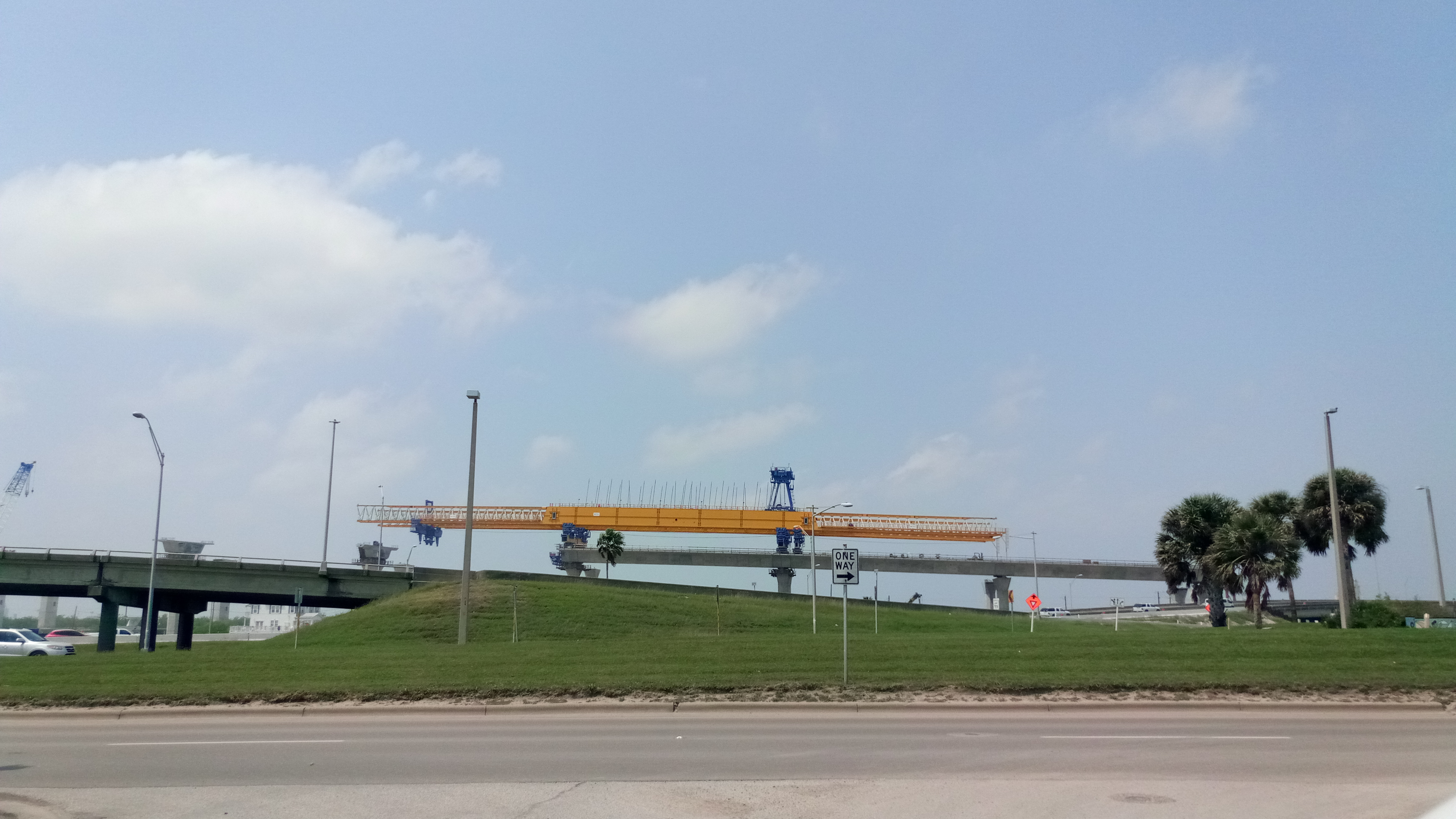
The New Harbor Bridge under construction in 2019

To assemble the superstructure, box girders cast near the bridge site are lifted and brought into place using a self-propelled gantry crane, and then the tendons are post-tensioned before the crane moves to the next segment and repeats.

The structure is slated to be the longest cable-stayed, concrete segmental bridge in North America. Until the completion of the Gordie Howe International Bridge, also under construction, it will also have the longest cable-stayed span in the North America. Corpus Christi's nearby John F. Kennedy Memorial Causeway, which has a similar construction method, is the first precast concrete post-tensioned segmental box girder bridge in the United States.

=== Construction suspension ===
In March 2018, a pedestrian bridge collapse in Florida prompted extensive reevaluation of bridge construction across the United States. An NTSB investigation ultimately concluded that the chief probable cause for the Florida bridge collapse was an error in design by the FIGG Bridge Group. FIGG was also the engineer for the Harbor Bridge Project. This prompted a design review by TxDOT who in 2019 ultimately asked the bridge developer Flatiron/Dragados to remove FIGG and select a different engineering firm. (Note: FIGG had previously been removed from another Texas project, the replacement of the Sam Houston Ship Channel Bridge.)

In July 2020 the developer designated the new engineer for the project as Arup-CFC, who expected no major changes. Construction resumed in August 2021.

In July 2022 a TxDOT-ordered independent review by International Bridge Technologies found significant design flaws that persisted in its design, including five primary areas of concern. (Note: "...the five primary areas of concern are: (1) inadequate capacity of the pylon drilled shafts, (2) deficiencies in footing caps that led IBT to report that the bridge would collapse under certain load conditions, (3) delta frame design defects, primarily related to the connections between the delta frames and the adjacent precast box units, (4) significant uplift at the intermediate piers, and (5) excessive torsion and other stresses related to crane placement during construction.") TxDOT subsequently suspended work on the bridge. The developer Flatiron/Dragados disputes some of these findings, and as of September 2022 discussion were ongoing with TxDOT regarding future construction and potential design remedies.

=== Work continues ===
TxDOT and Arup-CFC resolved one of the five design issues, deciding to add additional steel reinforcement to the delta box girders, and work resumed on those sections as of November 3, 2022. Construction of the approach spans has continued despite the halt on the main span and towers, and were over 80% complete as of October 28, 2022. TxDOT and Flatiron/Dragados resolved the four remaining design issues in April 2023.

In January 2025, the main span connection of the new Corpus Christi Harbor Bridge was completed when the last southbound segment was installed. After the main span was completed, the crew installed the remaining parts of the bridge, including lighting, barriers, railings, and drainage systems. The bridge was then prepared for opening to traffic. In April 2025, project officials announced that the bridge had reached its final stages of construction after the midspan closure was completed, marking a construction milestone for the cable-stayed structure.

On June 28, 2025, the new Harbor Bridge opened to southbound traffic, along with northbound lanes shortly after. Once the new bridge opened, the demolition of the original Harbor Bridge began. The replacement bridge includes a 205-foot vertical clearance for larger vessels that pass through the Corpus Christi Ship Channel and is designed to last about 170 years.
