= Corpus Christi Harbor Bridge =

Former bridge in Corpus Christi, Texas

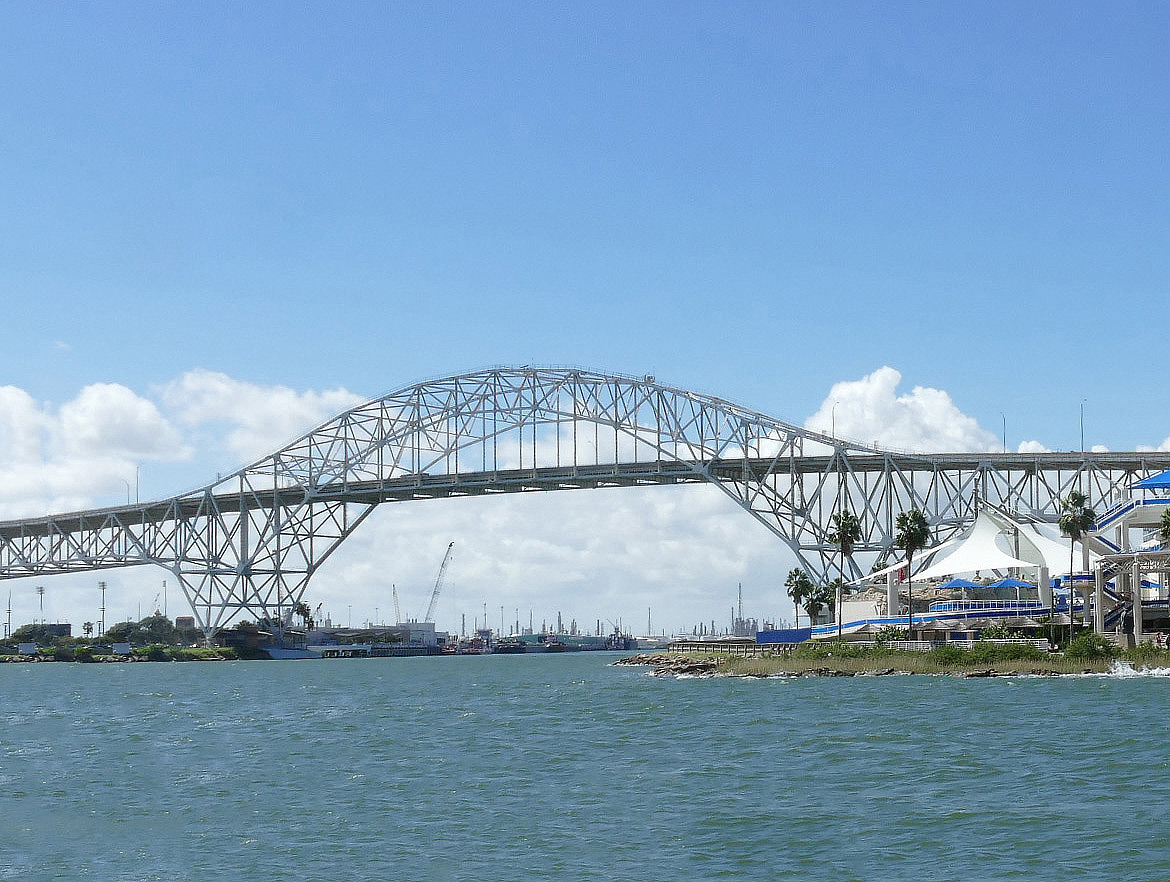
- The Harbor Bridge crossing over Corpus Christi in 2018
- Coordinates: 27°48′46″N 97°23′43″W
- Carries: 6 lanes of US 181 / SH 35
- Crosses: Port of Corpus Christi
- Locale: Corpus Christi, Texas
- Official name: Corpus Christi Harbor Bridge

Characteristics
- Design: Through arch bridge
- Total length: 5,818 ft (1,773 m)
- Width: 73 ft (22 m)
- Height: 243 ft (74 m)
- Longest span: 620 ft (190 m)
- Clearance below: 138 ft (42 m)

History
- Construction start: May 1956
- Construction end: 1959
- Opened: October 23, 1959
- Closed: September 3, 2025

Statistics
- Toll: None

Location
- Interactive map of Corpus Christi Harbor Bridge

The Corpus Christi Harbor Bridge was a through arch bridge in Corpus Christi, Texas, that carried six lanes of U.S. Route 181 (US 181) and Texas State Highway 35 (SH 35) from downtown Corpus Christi to Rincon Point, known to locals as North Beach. The bridge crossed the Corpus Christi Ship Channel and handled nearly 26,000 vehicles daily.

A new bridge called the New Harbor Bridge was completed and opened to traffic on June 28, 2025. It allows larger ships to pass beneath, permitting safer pedestrian transit and reconfiguring the highway interchange system in the surrounding community. The bridge is approximately 295 feet taller than the old bridge, providing greater clearance for ships traveling through the Corpus Christi Ship Channel. The project was expected to improve the port of Corpus Christi ability to accommodate larger vessels and support future growth.

== New Harbor Bridge Project ==
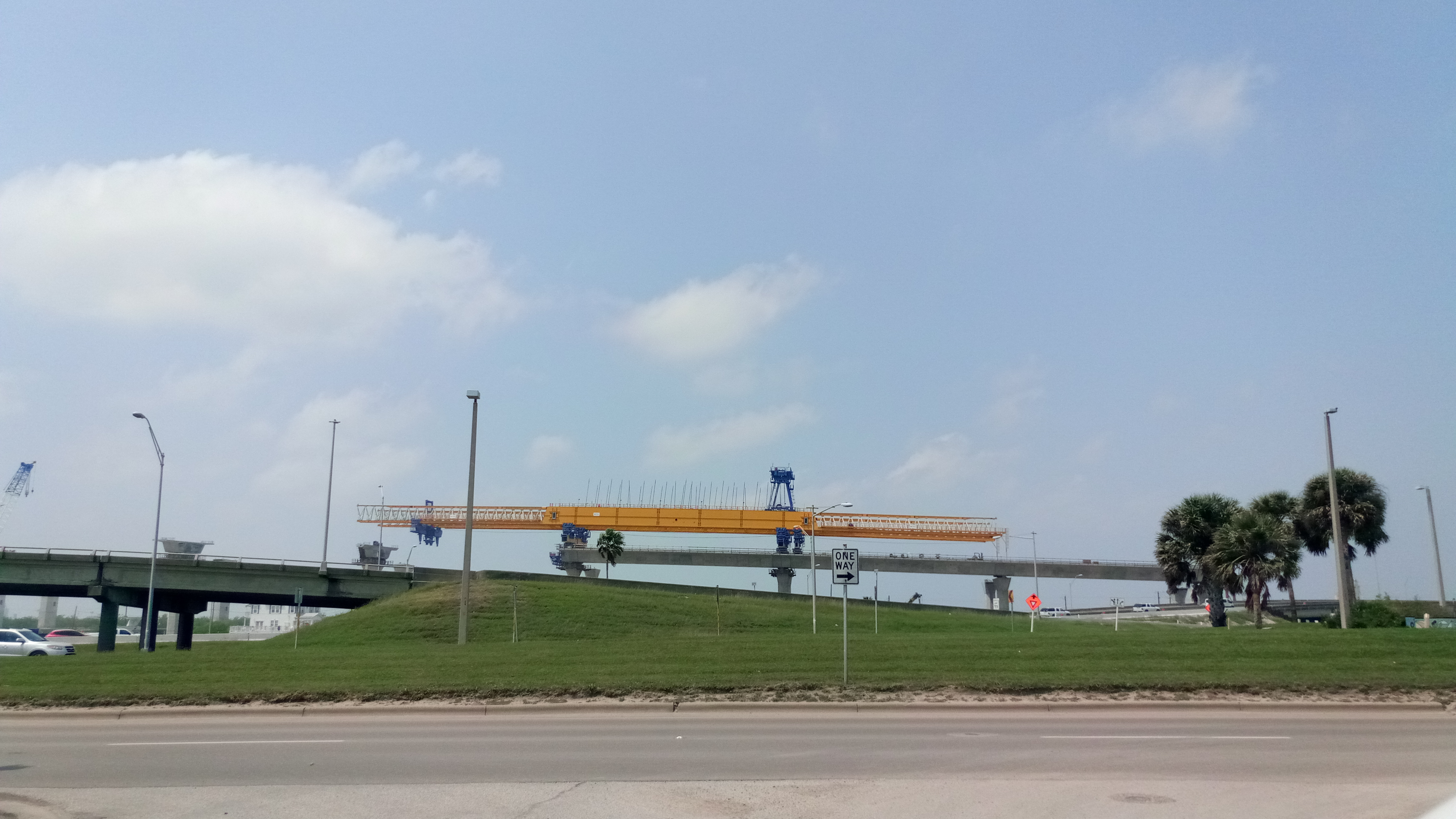
The new Harbor Bridge under construction in 2019

New Harbor Bridge Project

Main article: Harbor Bridge Project

The new Harbor Bridge under construction in 2019

In 2008, local, state, and federal authorities began the replacement process. The new bridge was designed to improve the transportation system and provide additional clearance for ships.The project experienced delays due to engineering and design problems, which affected the original construction schedule.

On November 15, 2019, design activities on the New Harbor Bridge were suspended by the Texas Department of Transportation. The suspension followed concerns involving FIGG bridge engineers, the firm responsible for the bridge design. The company had also designed a pedestrian bridge at Florida International University that collapsed during construction in March 2018. Following the incident, the Texas department of transportation dismissed FIGG from the Corpus Christi Project, contributing to further delays.

New Harbor Bridge

In July 2020, Arup and Carlos Fernandez Casado S.L. was hired to review, recertify, and complete the main span of the bridge. In August 2022, TxDOT halted construction after deficiencies were found within the superstructure of the new bridge. Construction resumed in December 2022 once these problems were resolved.

The bridge was fully completed on July 8, 2025. The construction delays also affected business connected to the Port of Corpus Christi. The older harbor infrastructure had limitations that affected the movement of larger ships, and some vessels had to be redirected. These delays created challenges for port operations and business that depended on shipping. […]
