= Arup Group =

Multinational professional services firm

Arup Group Limited
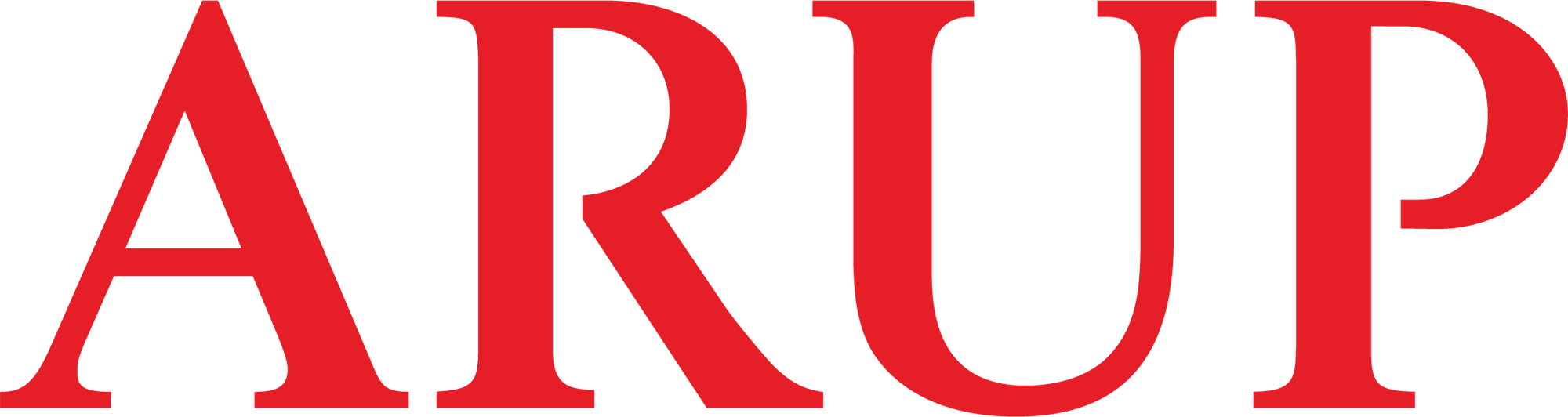
- Trade name: Arup
- Type: Private
- Industry: Engineering; Professional Services
- Founded: 1 April 1946; 80 years ago
- Headquarters: London, United Kingdom
- Number of locations: 94 offices in 34 countries (2023)
- Area served: Worldwide
- Key people: Hilde Tonne (chair); Jerome Frost (CEO)
- Services: Architecture; Consultancy; Design; Engineering; Software; Urban Planning
- Revenue: ▲£2202.2 million (2024)
- Operating income: ▲£59.1 million (2024)
- Net income: ▼£24.4 million (2024)
- Total assets: ▲£1564.6 million (2024)
- Owner: Employee-owned
- Number of employees: ▲17,208 (2022)
- Subsidiaries: Ove Arup & Partners International Ltd, Arup Associates Ltd, and others
- Website: www.arup.com

Arup, officially Arup Group Limited, is a British multinational professional services firm headquartered in London that provides design, engineering, architecture, planning, and advisory services across every aspect of the built environment. It employs about 17,000 people in over 90 offices across 35 countries, and has participated in projects in over 160 countries.

Arup was established in 1946 by Sir Ove Arup as Ove N. Arup Consulting Engineers. Through its involvement in high-profile projects such as the Sydney Opera House, it became well known for undertaking complex and challenging projects. In 1970, Arup stepped down from actively leading the company, setting out the principles which have continued to guide its operation. Arup's ownership is structured as a trust, whose beneficiaries are its employees, past, and present who receive a share of its operating profit each year.

== History ==
=== Foundation ===
The company was founded in London in 1946 as Ove N. Arup Consulting Engineers by Sir Ove Arup. Arup had established himself in the 1930s as an expert in reinforced concrete, known for projects such as the Penguin Pool at London Zoo. According to the architectural author Ian Volner, Arup's vision when establishing the company came out of a combination of his wartime experiences and a progressive-minded philosophy broadly aligning with early modernism, was for the organisation to be a force for peace and social betterment in the postwar world. To this end, it would employ professionals of diverse disciplines that could work together to produce projects of greater quality than was achievable by them working in isolation, a concept known as 'Total Design'.

=== Early years ===
As the company grew, Arup spurned the common practice amongst its rivals of acquiring other companies; instead, it pursued natural growth, opening up new offices at locations where the potential for work had been identified. During 1963, together with the architect Philip Dowson, a new division of the company, Arup Associates, was formed.

Within 25 years of its establishment, the firm had become well known for its design work for the built environment, acquiring a reputation for its competence at undertaking projects that were structurally and/or logistically complex. Arup himself worked on multiple projects during the firm's early years, including the Sydney Opera House, where he was lead engineer, and which author Peter Jones credited with launching Arup into the premier league of engineering consultancies. The Opera House was the first application of computer calculations to an engineering project, using the Ferranti Pegasus computer to generate models. During Arup's lifetime, the company would also work on high-profile projects such as the 'inside-out' Centre Pompidou with Rogers & Piano, and the HSBC headquarters with Norman Foster & Partners.

=== "Key Speech" ===
1970 was a particularly transformative year for the firm; 24 years after founding the company, Arup opted to retire from actively leading the company. At the time, the firm (then Ove Arup & Partners) was made up of several independent practices spread across the globe, so prior to his departure, Arup delivered his "Key Speech" on 9 July in Winchester to all his partners from the various practices. The speech set out the aims of the firm and identified the principles of governance by which they might be achieved. These included quality of work, total architecture, humane organisation, straight and honorable dealings, social usefulness, and the reasonable prosperity of its members. Arup's philosophy work on influential projects was the subject of a dedicated retrospective at the V&A Museum in 2016.

=== 2020s ===
Arup fell victim to a deepfake scam at their Hong Kong office, resulting in a loss of approximately $25 million. Fraudsters used AI-generated video and audio to impersonate senior company officials, deceiving an employee into transferring funds across multiple transactions.

== Company ==
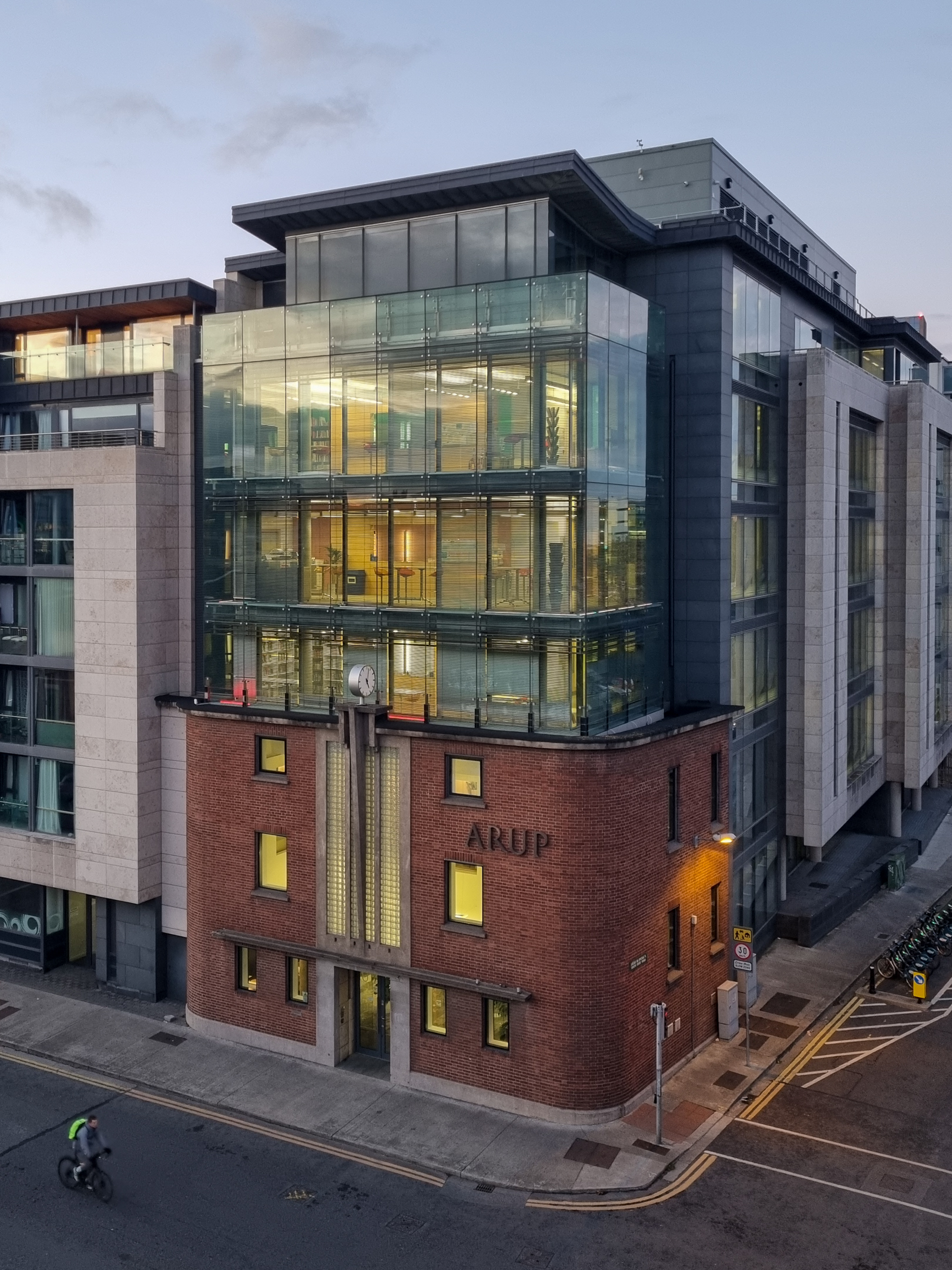
An office building occupied by Arup in the Dublin Docklands

Arup is an employee-owned business, with all staff owning a stake in the company and part of a global profit share. By 2013, Arup was operating 90 offices across 60 countries around the world. These offices are elaborately interconnected by shared internet-based collaborative working packages and communication systems that can, where required, enable a single project to be worked on by multiple offices across a seamless, 24-hour working cycle. However, it is more common for individual offices to specialise in working on an assigned subsection of a project rather than continuously exchanging.

The BBC Television and RIBA documentary The Brits who Built the Modern World highlighted Arup's collaboration with architects and described Arup as "the engineering firm which Lord Norman Foster and his peers Lord Richard Rogers, Sir Nicholas Grimshaw, Sir Michael Hopkins and Sir Terry Farrell most frequently relied upon."

The firm has published an annual sustainability report since 2008, and is involved in several projects around the world aiming to cut greenhouse gas emissions, such as Dongtan Eco-City, which is planned to be zero waste, and the High Speed 2 Interchange Station, which is the first railway station in the world to achieve BREEAM outstanding certification.

Arup runs community engagement programmes comprising initiatives to combat homelessness, improve sanitation in disaster relief programmes, and disaster recovery after earthquakes. They also engage in partnerships with governments, NGOs, think tanks, and other advocacy groups. Arup secured its first Fair Tax Mark certification from the Fair Tax Foundation in 2024.

=== Sports ===
Arup had its own sports division, specialising in designing, consulting and structural engineering for sporting facilities such as stadia. The Bird's Nest Stadium for the 2008 Olympics was complimented for its striking architectural appearance and the City of Manchester Stadium for the 2002 Commonwealth Games has stairless entry to the upper tiers through circular ramps outside the stadium. The most notable stadium projects led by Arup remain the City of Manchester Stadium (2002), Allianz Arena (2005), Beijing National Stadium (2008), Donbas Arena (2009) and the Singapore Sports Hub (2014).

== Awards ==
=== Awards to group ===
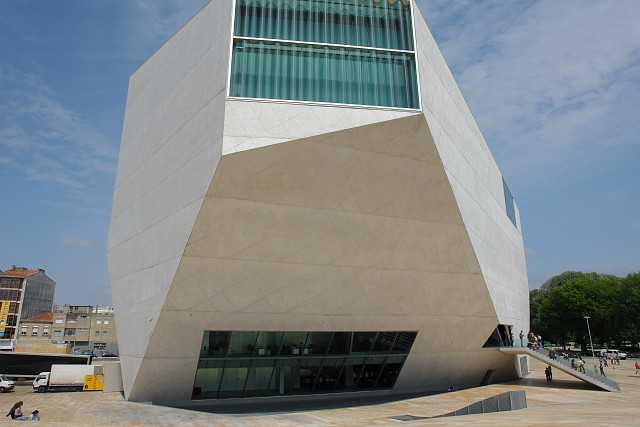
Casa da Música

The firm is consistently placed amongst top performers in Corporate and Social Responsibility rankings such as the ACCSR. Arup's multidisciplinary sports venue design and engineering scope on the Singapore Sports Hub won the 2013 World Architecture Festival Award in the Future Projects, Leisure Category. The Casa da Música, Porto, designed by Arup and Office for Metropolitan Architecture was nominated for the 2007 Stirling Prize. Arup won the Gold Medal for Architecture at the National Eisteddfod of Wales of 1998 for their work on the Control Techniques Research and Development HQ, in Newtown, Powys.

Arup Fire has won the Fire Safety Engineering Design award four times since its creation in 2001. The 2001 inaugural award was won for Arup's contribution to the Eden Project in Cornwall, UK, the world's largest greenhouse. In 2004, the design for London's City Hall was appointed joint winner. In 2005, the Temple Mills Eurostar Depot won. The 2006 winning entry was for Amethyst House, a nine-storey building with an atrium from the ground to the top, in Manchester, UK.

Arup was awarded the 2010 Live Design Excellence Award for Theatre Design for the integrated theatre and acoustic team's design for the new Jerome Robbins Theatre, created for Mikhail Baryshnikov and The Wooster Group. The Evelyn Grace Academy, London designed by Zaha Hadid Architects and Arup won the RIBA Stirling Prize in 2011. Arup was named Tunnel Design Firm of the Year at the 2012 ITA AITES International Tunnelling Awards.

== Notable projects ==
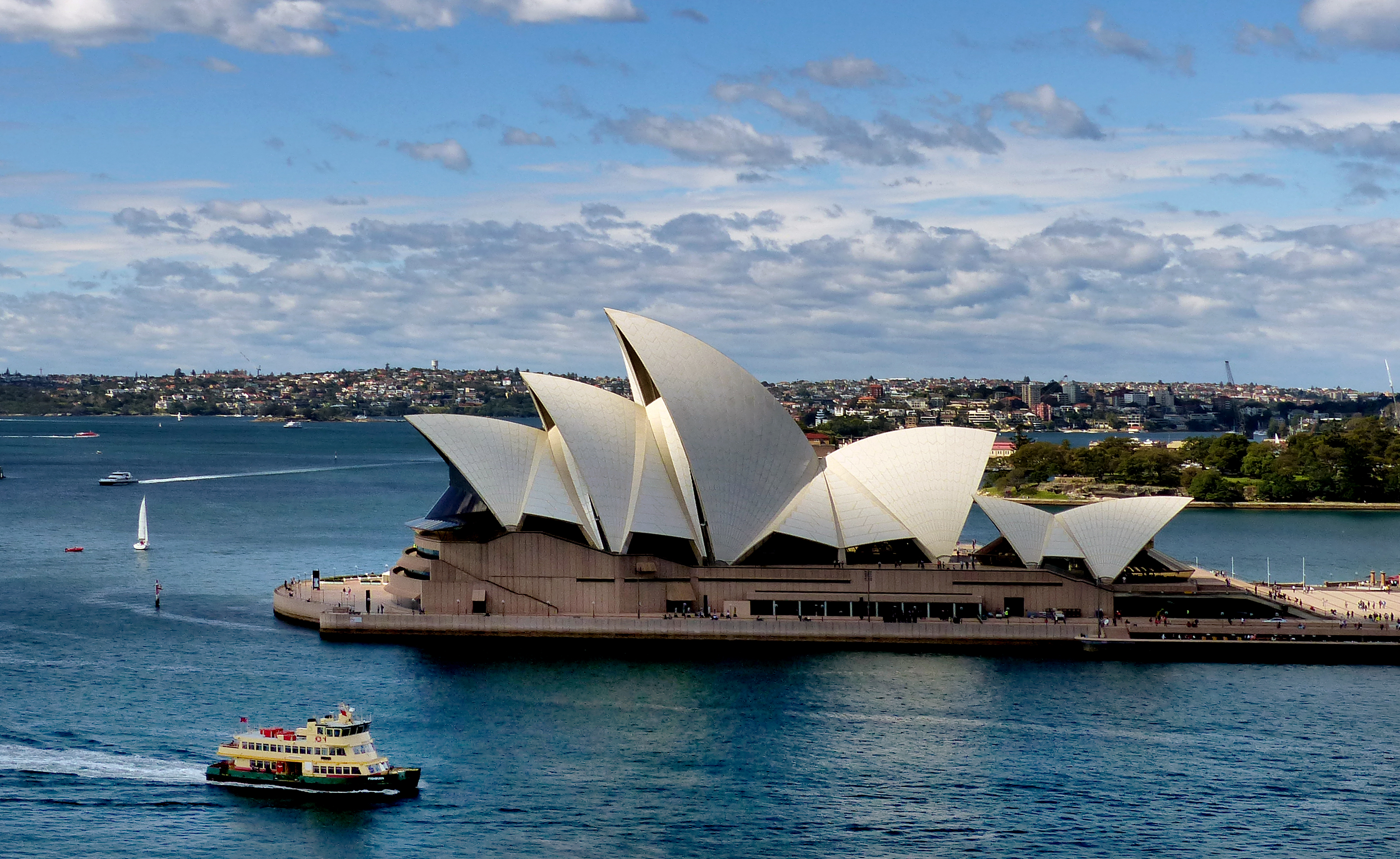
Sydney Opera House, New South Wales, Australia (1973)

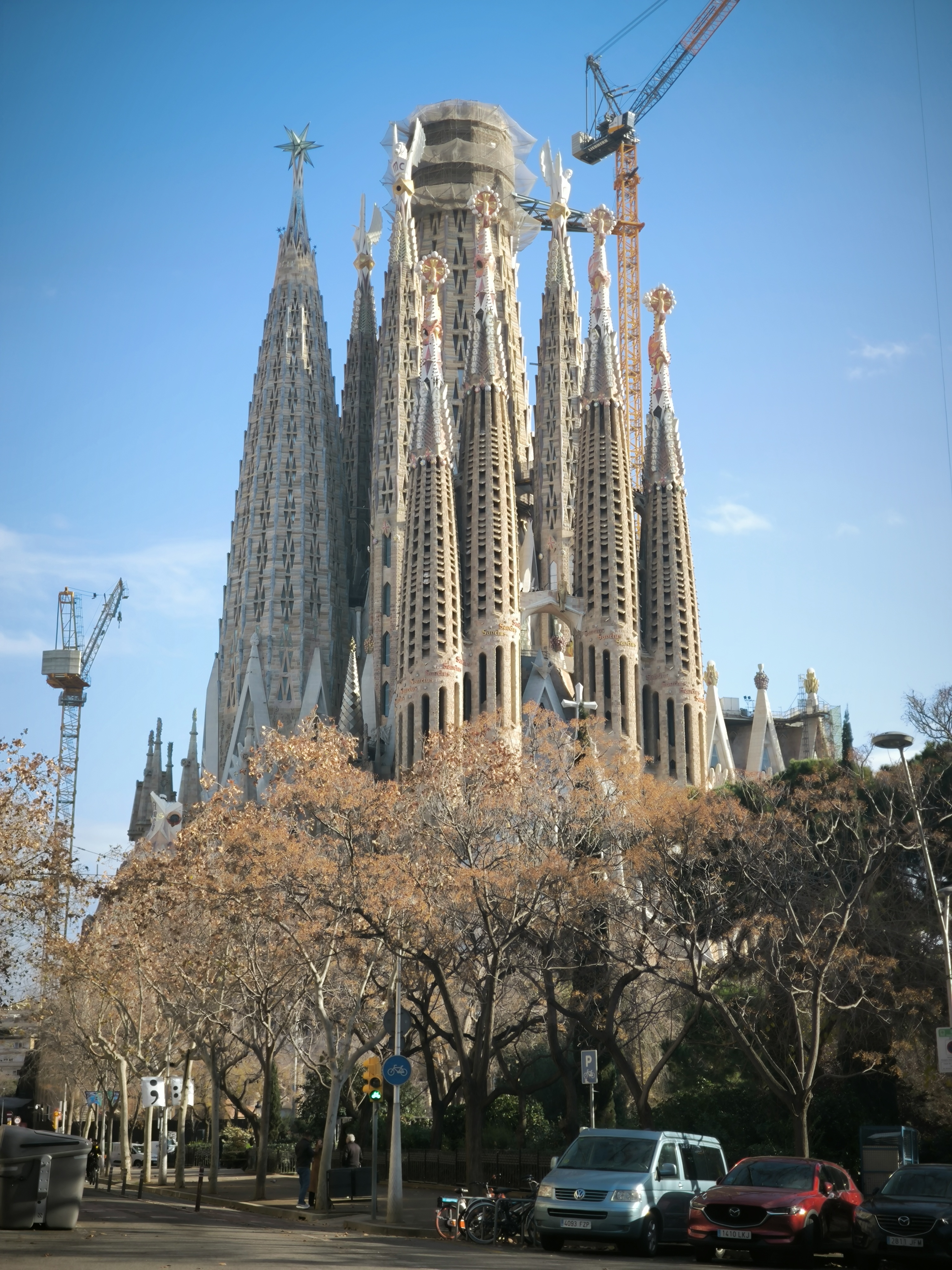
Sagrada Familia, Barcelona, Spain (Ongoing)

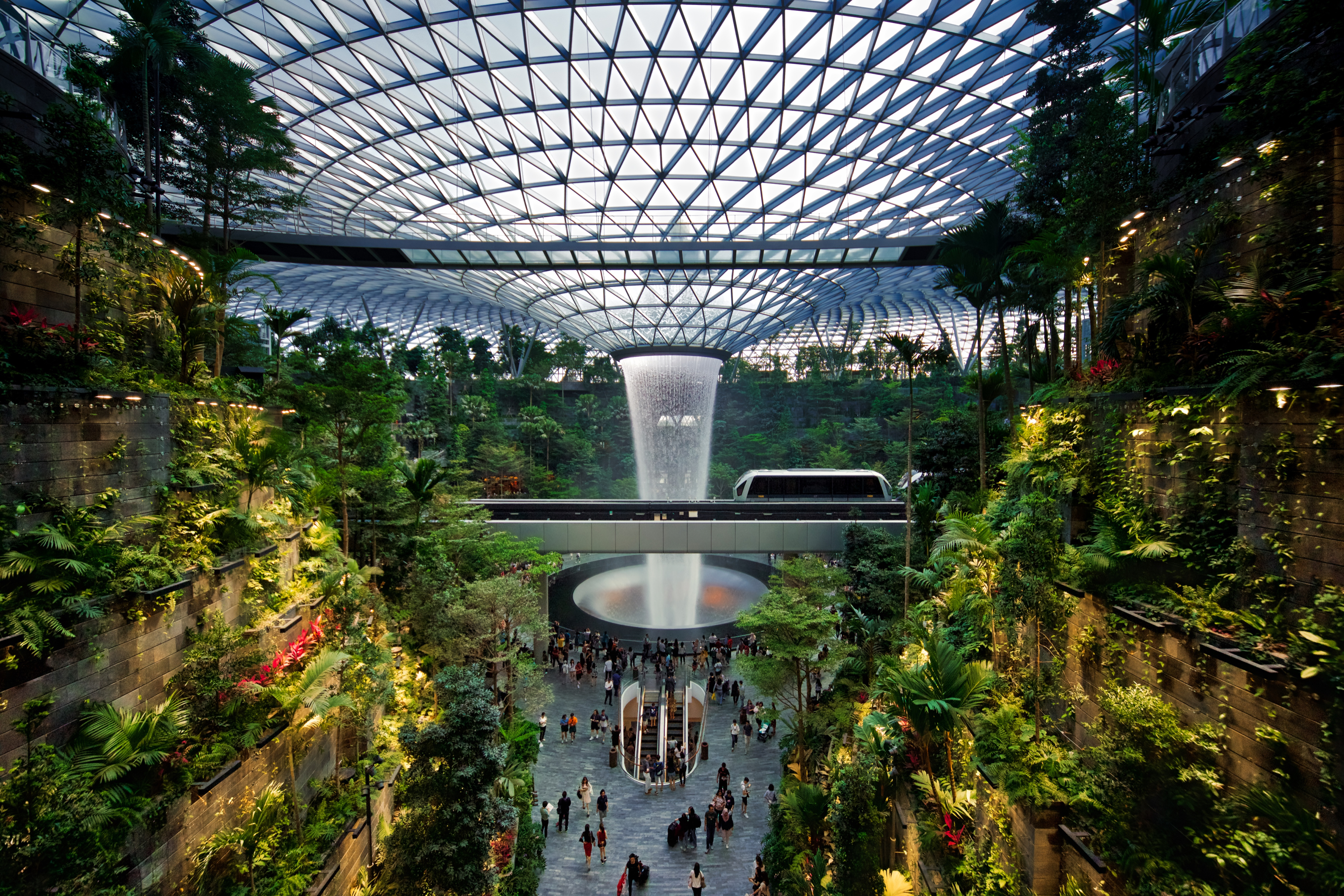
The Jewel, Singapore

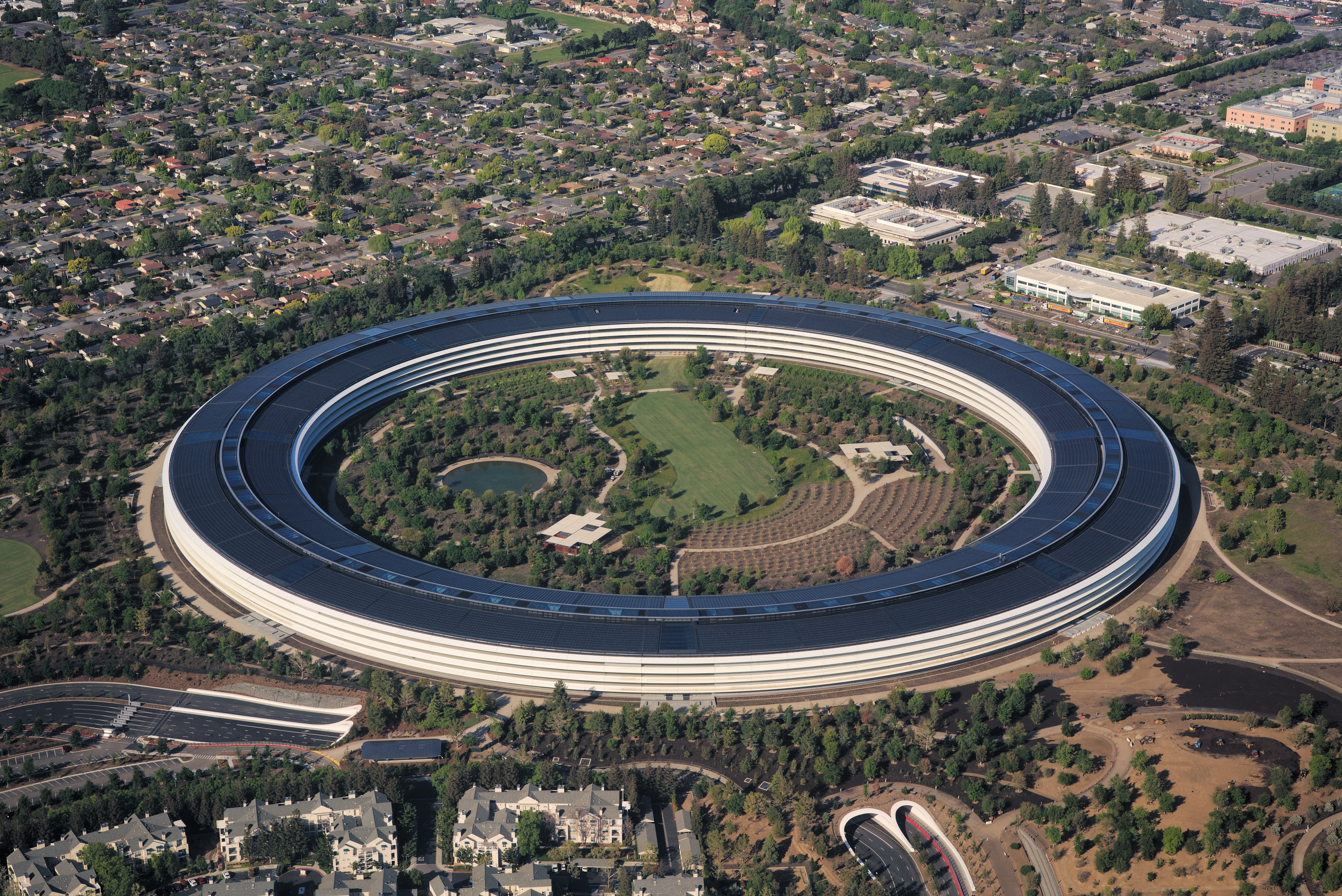
Apple Park, California, USA (2018)

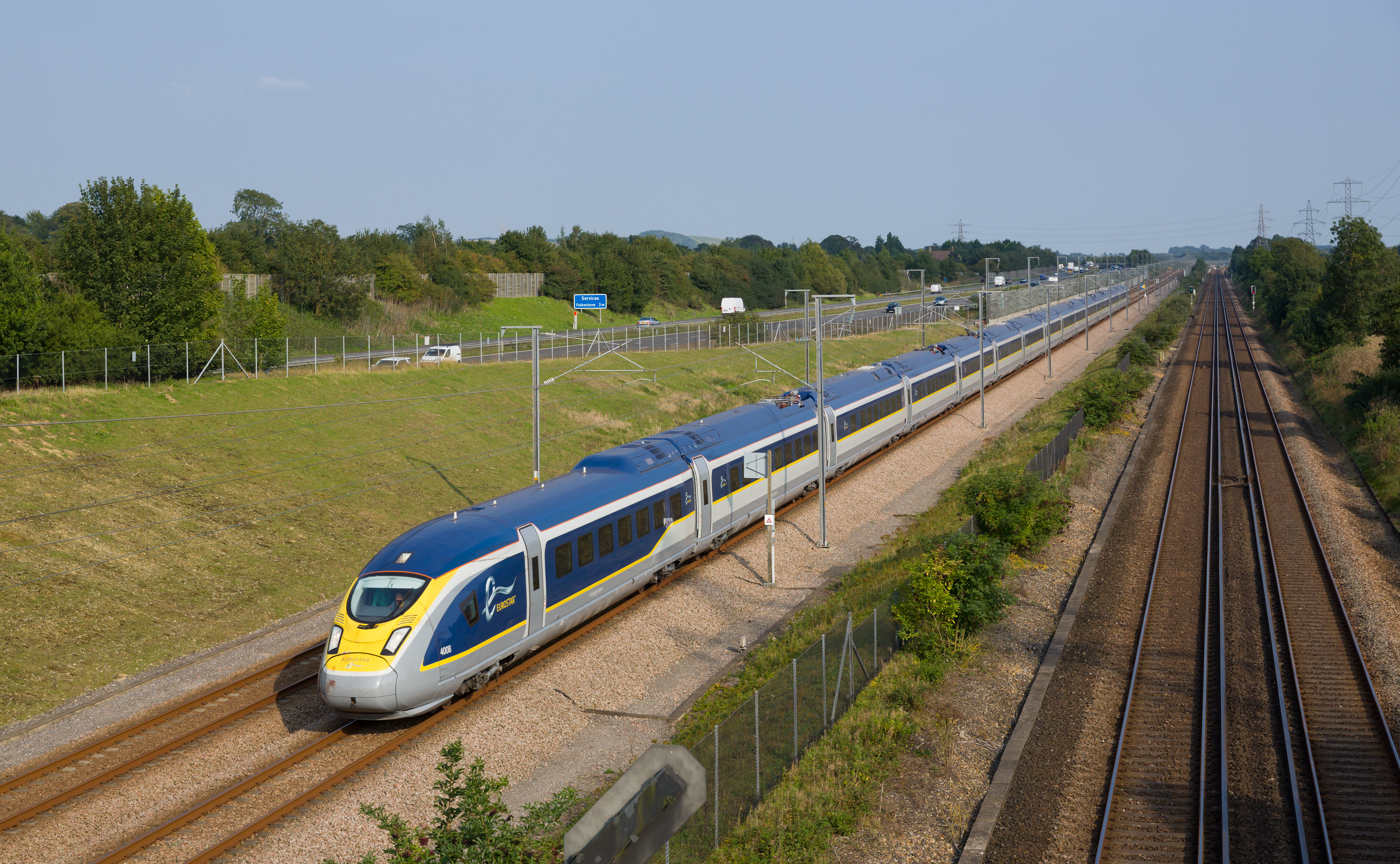
HS1, England, UK

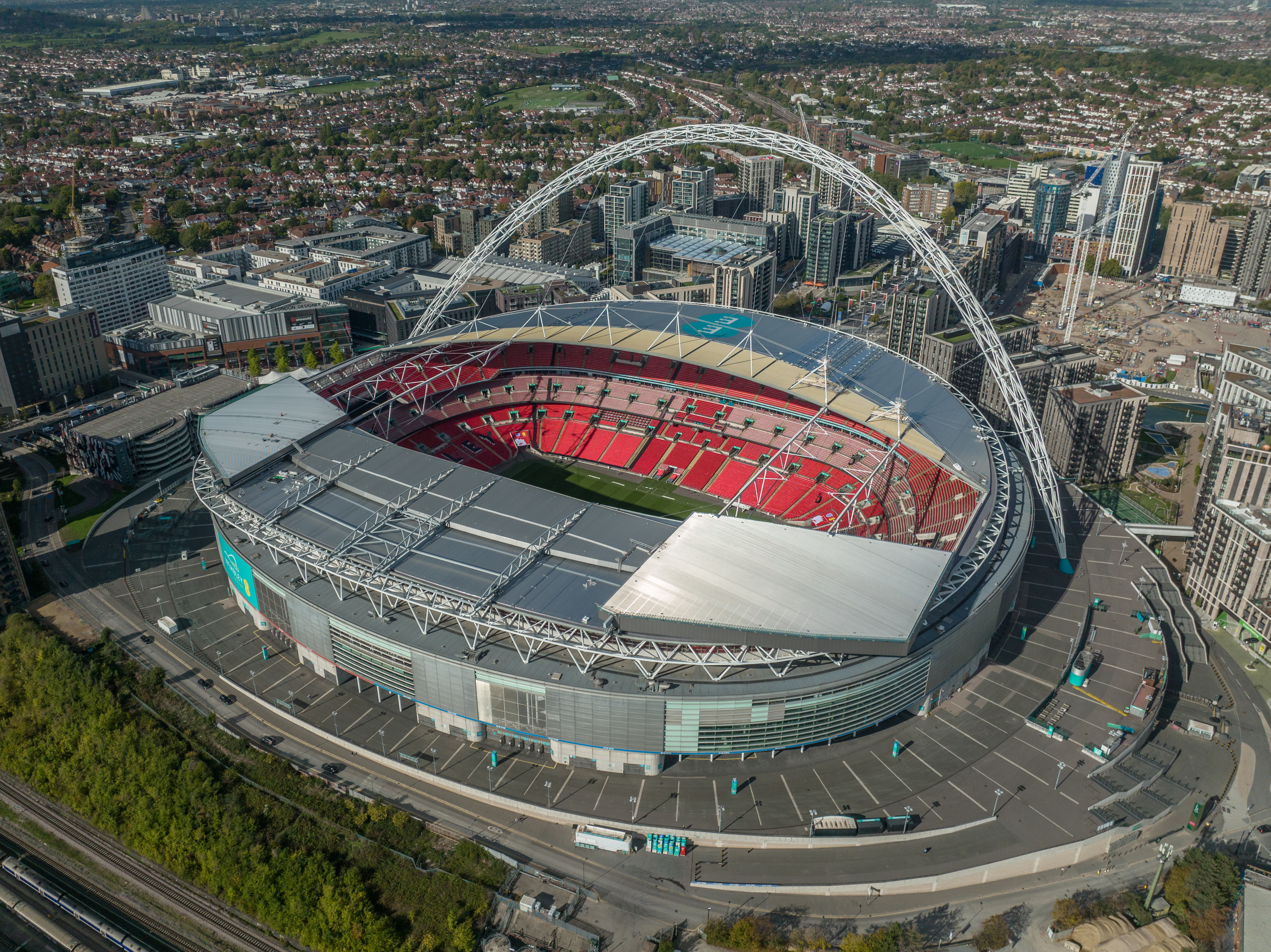
Wembley Stadium, London, UK

=== Arts and culture ===
- Sydney Opera House, New South Wales, Australia, 1973
- Centre Pompidou, Paris, France, 1977
- British Museum Great Court, London, United Kingdom, 2000
- Zeitz MOCAA, Cape Town, South Africa, 2017
- Sphere, Nevada, United States, 2023
- Sagrada Familia, Barcelona, Spain, Ongoing

=== Aviation ===
- Hong Kong International Airport, 1998
- Madrid Barajas Airport Terminal 4, Spain, 2006
- Central Utility Plant replacement at Los Angeles International Airport, United States, 2013
- Heathrow Terminal 2, United Kingdom, 2014
- Beijing Daxing International Airport, China, 2019
- The Jewel Changi Airport, Singapore, 2019
- Delta Sky Way Program at Los Angeles International Airport, United States, 2024
- John F. Kennedy International Airport, United States, 2025
- LaGuardia Airport, United States, 2025
- Taoyuan International Airport Terminal 3, Taiwan, Ongoing
- Western Sydney Airport, New South Wales, Australia, 2026

=== Bridges ===
- Kingsgate Bridge, Durham, United Kingdom, 1963
- Millenium Bridge, London, United Kingdom, 2000
- Øresund Bridge, Denmark/Sweden, 2000
- U.S. 181 Harbor Bridge, United States, 2025
- Alexandra Bridge replacement, Canada, Ongoing

=== Commercial ===
- Eastgate, Harare, Zimbabwe, 1996

=== Education ===
- Seattle Central Library, Washington, United States, 2004
- National Library, Qatar, 2018

=== Energy ===
- Sizewell C, United Kingdom, Ongoing

=== Mixed-use ===
- Barbican Estate, London, United Kingdom, 1976
- Marina Bay Sands, Singapore, 2010
- New Parliament Building, City Gate and Performance Area, Valletta, 2011-14
- The Londoner, Macau, 2021
- Innovent Biologics Global R&D Center, China, 2025

=== Offices ===
- HSBC Building, Hong Kong, 1985
- Lloyd's Building, London, United Kingdom, 1986
- 30 St Mary Axe (The Gherkin), London, United Kingdom, 2004
- CCTV Headquarters, Beijing, China, 2012
- Apple Park, California, United States, 2018

=== Rail ===
- High Speed 1, United Kingdom, 2007
- Second Avenue Subway, New York, United States, 2017
- York University station, Canada, 2017
- Elizabeth Line, London, United Kingdom, 2022
- Belfast Grand Central station, Northern Ireland, 2024
- Line 6 Finch West, Canada, 2025
- California High Speed Rail, United States, Ongoing
- High Speed 2, United Kingdom, Ongoing

=== Science and industry ===
- Francis Crick Institute, London, United Kingdom, 2015
- Long-Baseline Neutrino Facility Far Site, United States, 2021
- CERN Science Gateway, Geneva, Switzerland, 2023

=== Sport ===
- Wembley Stadium, London, United Kingdom, 2007
- Beijing National Stadium (The Bird's Nest), China, 2008
- National Aquatics Centre (The Watercube), Beijing, China, 2008
- Lusail Stadium, Qatar, 2022
- Riverside Stadium, Middlesbrough, 1995

=== Tall buildings ===
- Commerzbank Tower, Frankfurt, Germany, 1997
- Turning Torso, Malmö, Sweden, 2005
- The Shard, London, United Kingdom, 2012
- Bosco Verticale, Milan, Italy, 2014
- Saigon Times Square, Ho Chi Minh City, Vietnam, 2015
- MahaNakhon, Bangkok, Thailand, 2016
- CITIC Tower, Beijing, China, 2018
- Raffles City, Chongqing, China, 2019
- Merdeka 118, Kuala Lumpur, Malaysia, 2024
