= Intech Contracting =

Kentucky-based construction contracting company

Intech Contracting LLC
- Company type: Private
- Industry: Construction & Engineering
- Founded: 1991
- Headquarters: Lexington, Kentucky, United States
- Key people: David Houchin, President
- Services: Bridge Renovation, Bridge Inspection Support, Heavy construction, Engineering, Project Management
- Website: http://www.intechcontracting.com

Intech Contracting LLC is a Kentucky-based construction contracting company that specializes in bridge repair and restoration, inspection support, and related services.

The firm is notable for finally completing the painting of the John F. Kennedy Memorial Bridge in Louisville, marking the end of nearly a decade of public controversy. Two previous contractors had failed to complete the job amidst a bribery scandal and disputes with state officials. Similarly, the company completed painting the Corpus Christi Harbor Bridge after a previous company's contract was canceled.

Intech has also contributed to the restoration efforts of several highly visible or historic bridges, including many of the surviving wooden covered bridges in Kentucky and the John A. Roebling Suspension Bridge in Cincinnati.

== Notable bridge rehabilitation projects ==
- Astoria-Megler Bridge
- Brent Spence Bridge
- Corpus Christi Harbor Bridge
- John A. Roebling Suspension Bridge
- John F. Kennedy Memorial Bridge
- Martin Luther King Jr. Memorial (Gulfgate) Bridge
- Mathews Bridge
- Various Historic Covered Bridges (see below)
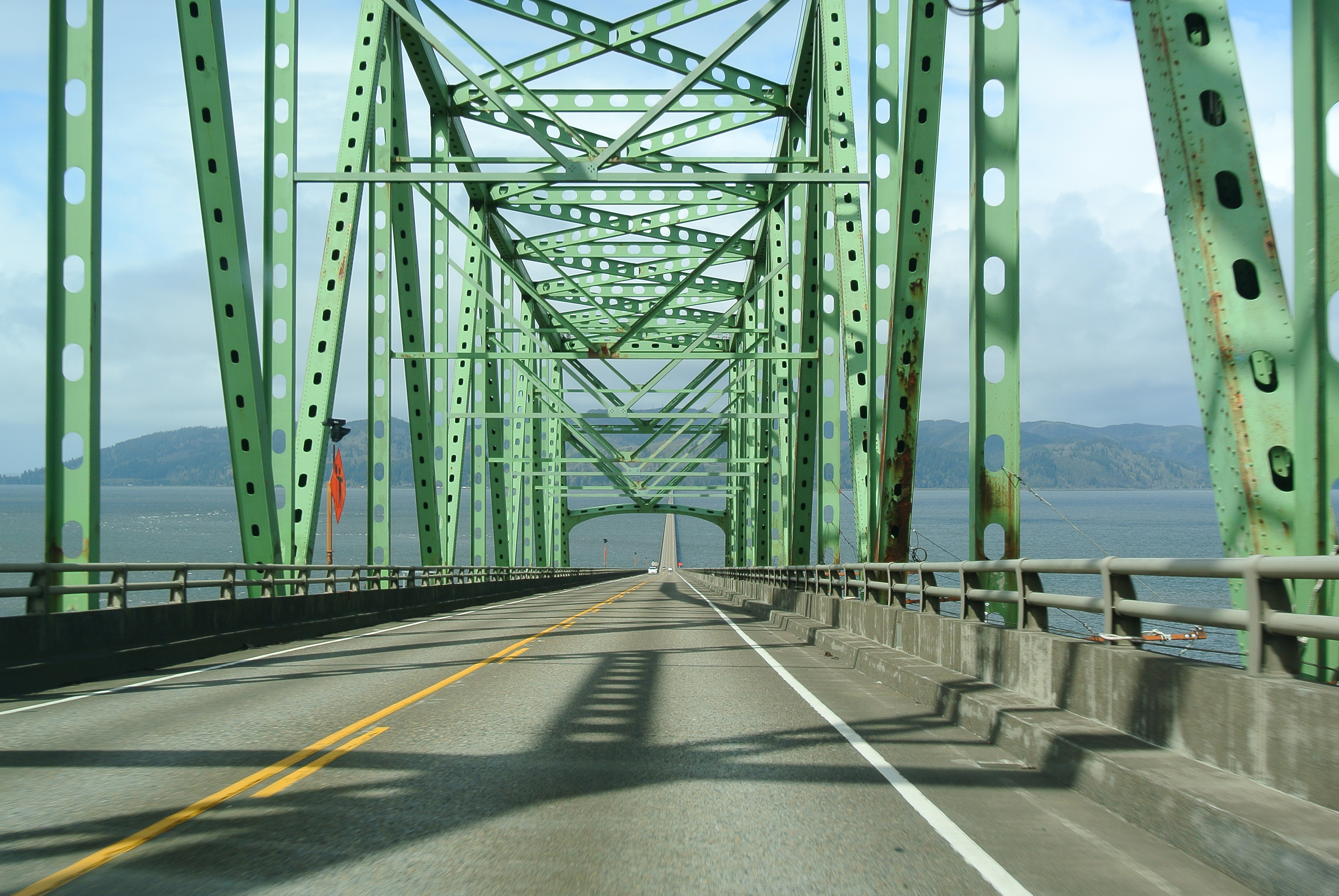
Astoria-Megler Bridge

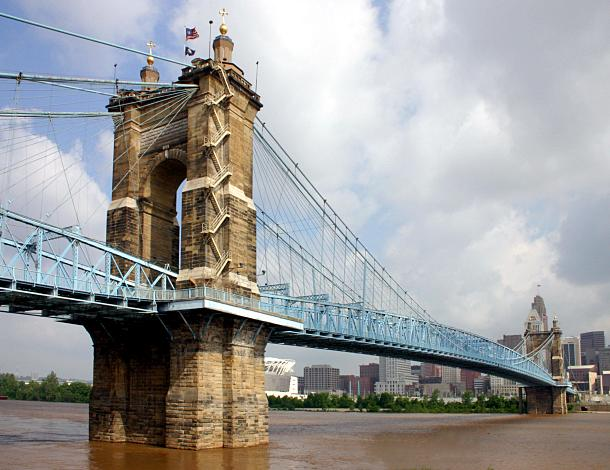
The John A. Roebling Suspension Bridge.

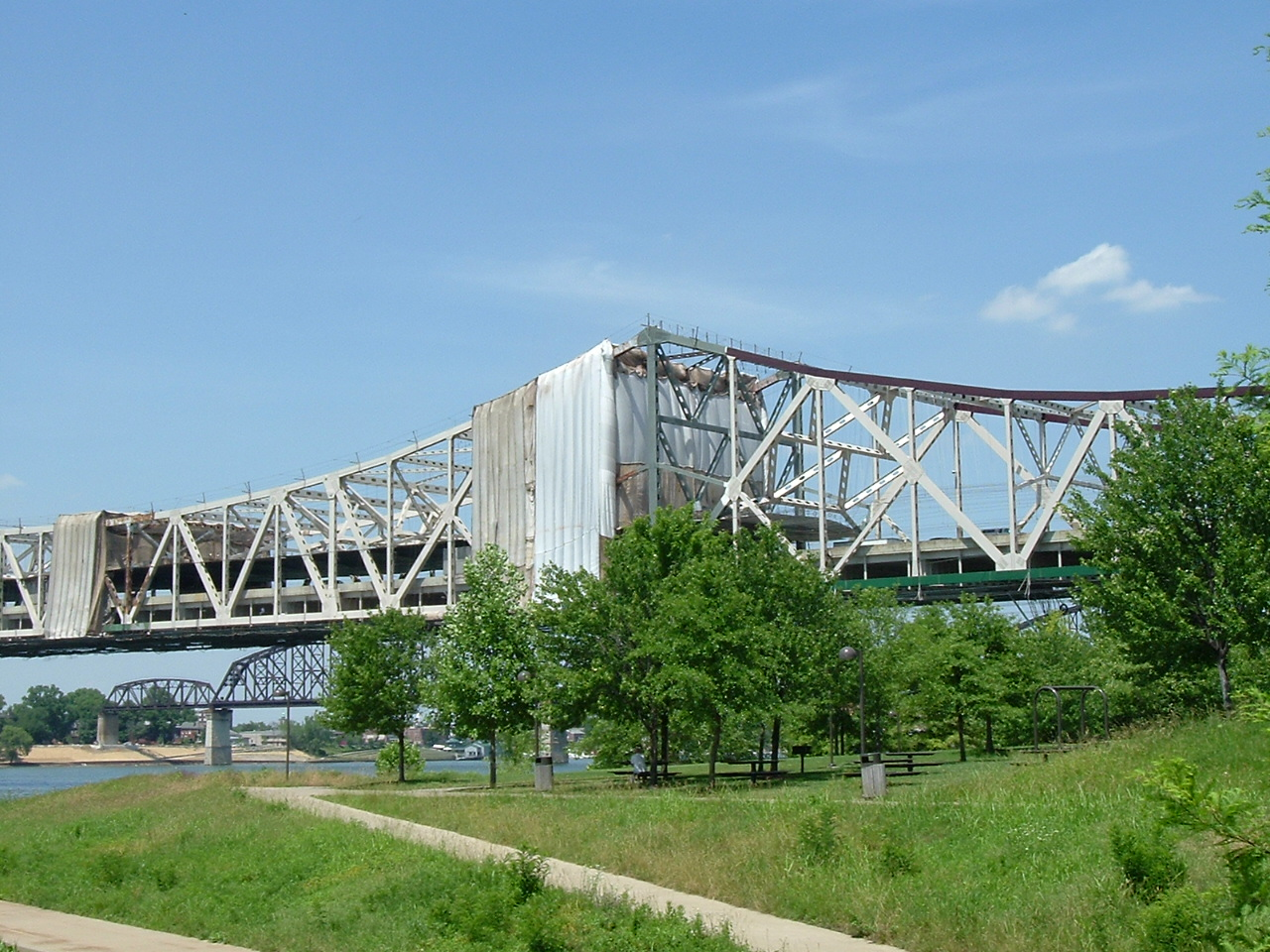
Ongoing work to paint the Kennedy Bridge. Note the far right part of the bridge painted in a three-color scheme, originally planned for the whole bridge. This was abandoned for a single-color scheme by the time Intech took over the project.

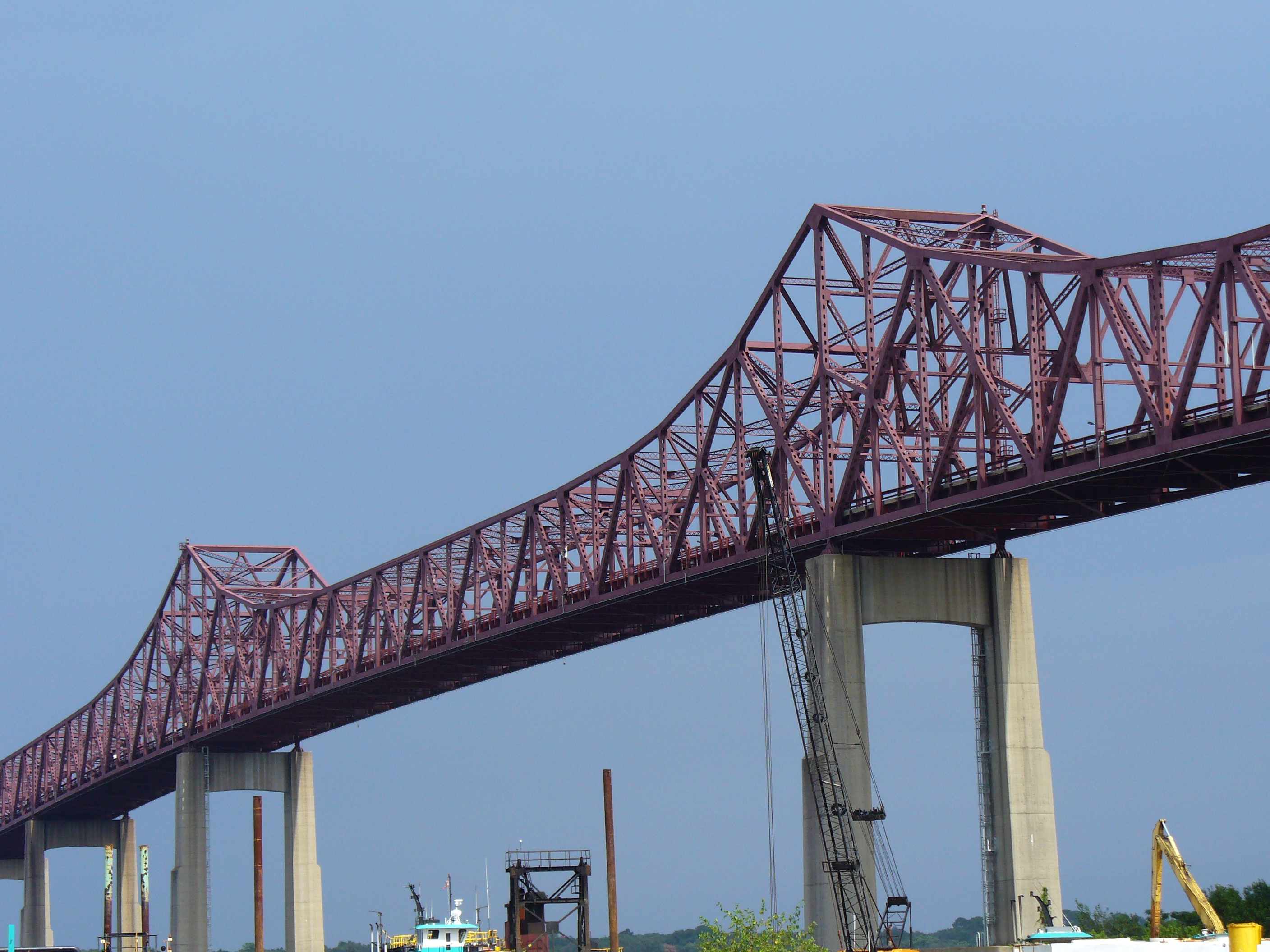
Mathews Bridge

== Covered bridges ==
Intech has restored over half of the 13 wooden covered bridges in Kentucky and others elsewhere.
