= Intec =

Intec can refer to:

- Intec Digital, a record label
- Intec College, South Africa
- INTEC Education College, Malaysia
- Instituto Tecnológico de Santo Domingo, Dominican Republic
- Intec, a company that published PC Engine games

== See also ==
- Intech (disambiguation)
