= Linpra =

Lithuanian association of engineering companies

- Full name in English: Engineering Industries Association of Lithuania
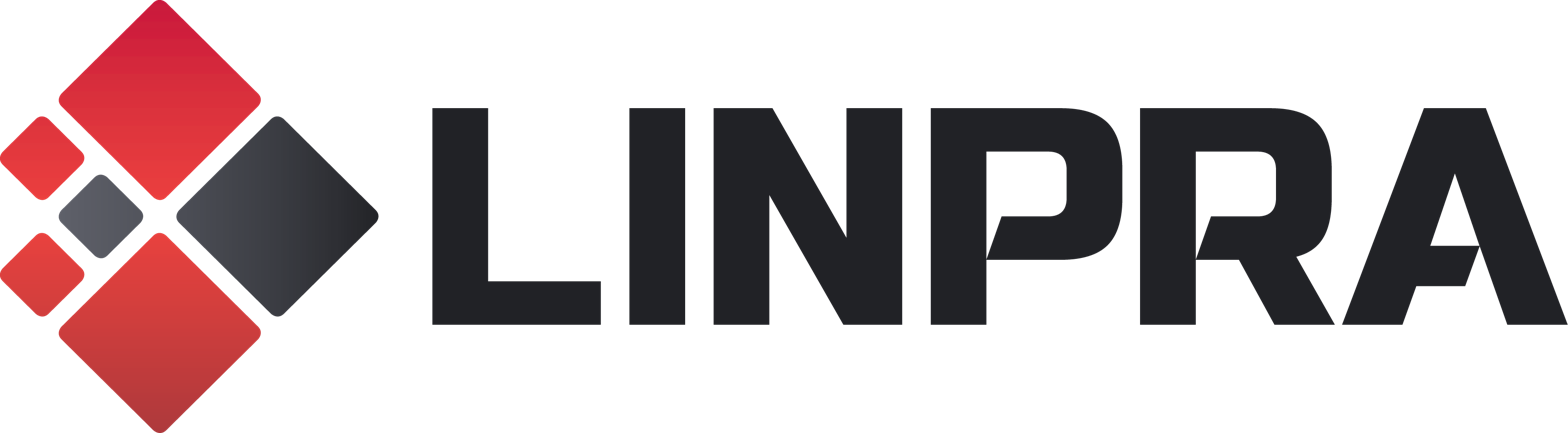

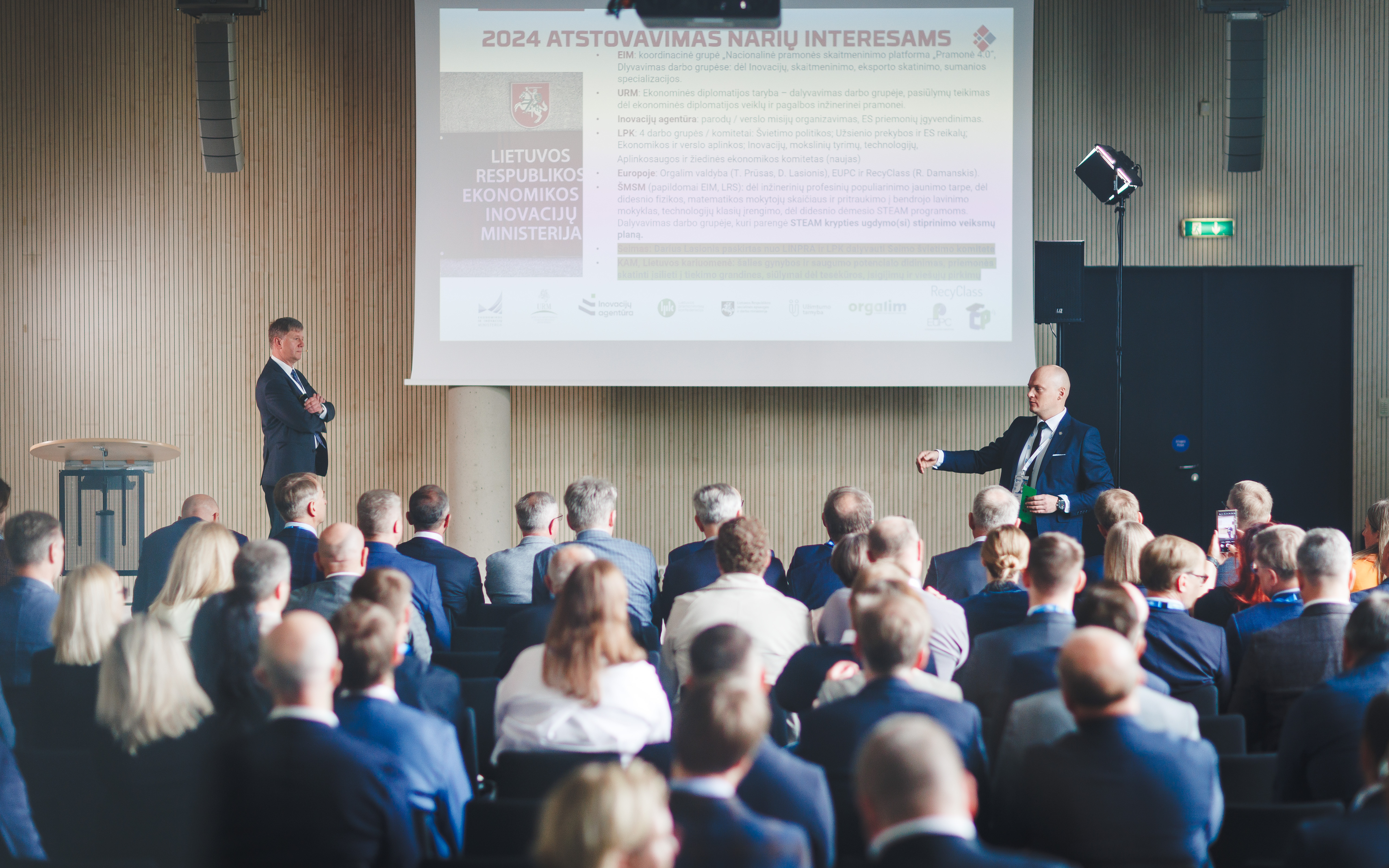
- Abbreviation: Linpra
- Formation: 1993; 33 years ago
- Type: Trade organization
- Purpose: Improving business conditions for engineering companies
- Headquarters: Vilnius, Lithuania
- Coordinates: 54°43′11″N 25°17′06″E
- Region served: Lithuania
- Members: 170 (2025)
- Official languages: Lithuanian, English
- Leader: Darius Lasionis
- Website: Official website, Lithuanian; Official website, English

LINPRA, established in 1993, is a Lithuanian trade organization for engineering companies, headquartered in Vilnius, Lithuania. It the largest engineering trade organization in The Baltic States, with 170 member companies. Lithuania's parliament Seimas consults with Linpra on laws that affect Lithuania's engineering and manufacturing sector.

== Overview ==
=== Events ===
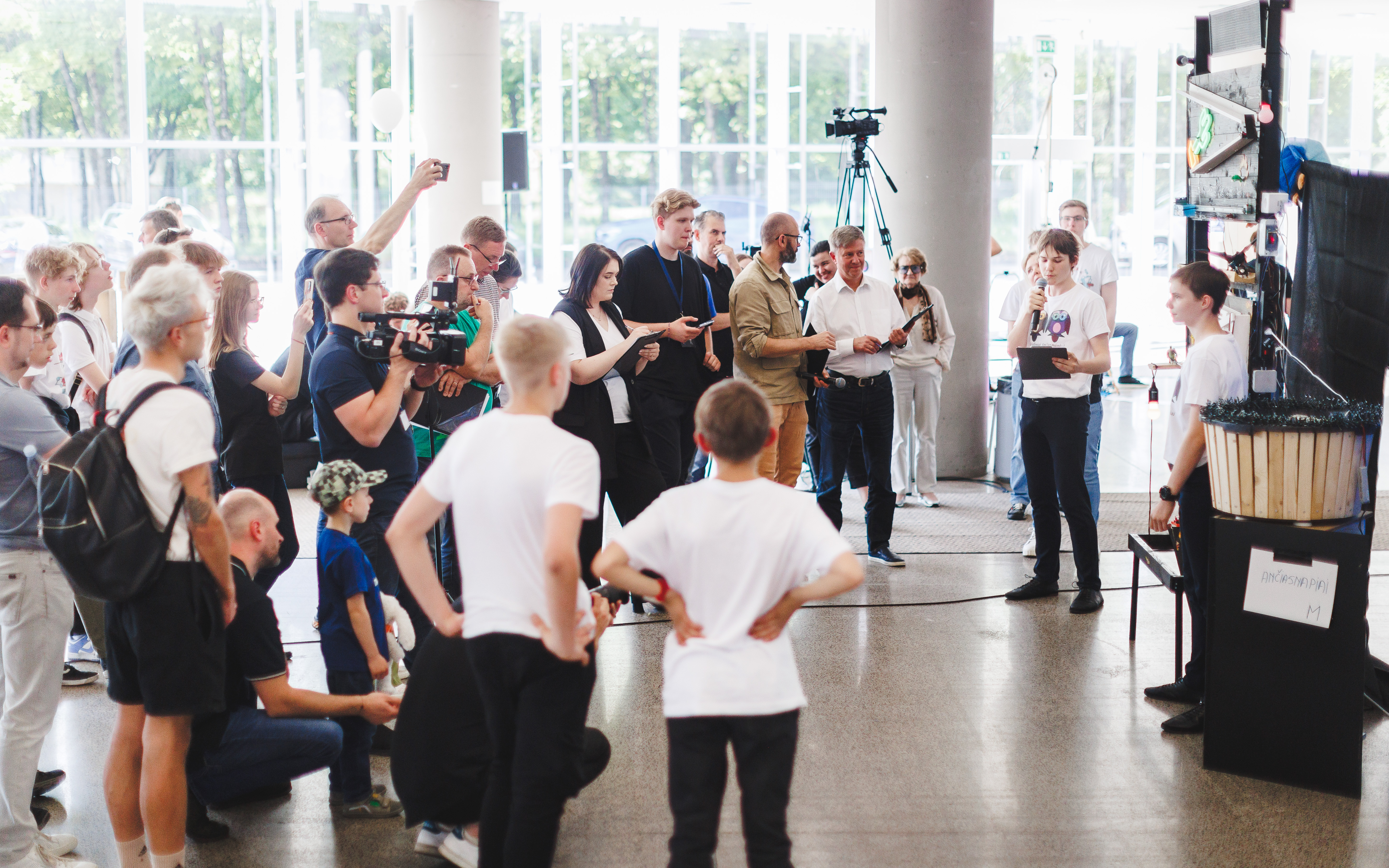
Steam Team 2024

Linpra represents Lithuanian engineering sector at various international events, conferences and exhibitions. It routinely participates in a number of trade shows including Alihankkija, Elmia Subcontractor, IAA Mobility, Hannover Messe and others.

It also organizes its own domestic and international events – business meetings, knowledge exchanges, conferences, etc. Multiple events and conferences during Balttechnika, the largest technology and engineering exhibition in the Baltic States, are organized by Linpra.

Some Linpra events are specifically aimed at high school and university students, to promote interest in engineering profession. Steam Team, Lithuania's largest engineering competition for high school students, is organized by Linpra.
