= Corpus Christi Ship Channel =

The Corpus Christi Ship Channel is a deep water navigable ship canal located in Corpus Christi, Texas. It is part of the Port of Corpus Christi, managed and controlled by the Corpus Christi Port Authority. The depth of the channel is 45 feet (14 meters). It is used mostly for heavy industry and the export and import of goods.

The channel dates back to the 1840s as a mud slough where cowboys hid and watched Comanche braves throw buffalo robes in the thick mud to prevent their horses from sinking. Years later, a wooden bridge was constructed over the slough, at the time called Hall's Bayou.
