= Illinois Technical College =

American defunct junior college

Coordinates: 41°52′31.4″N 87°37′35.0″W

- Illinois Technical College logo
- Former names: Chicago School of Television Repair; Electronics Trades Institute; Electronics Technical Institute of Illinois
- Type: Private junior college
- Active: 1950–1992
- Founder: Harold M. Rabin
- Accreditation: Higher Learning Commission
- Location: 506 S. Wabash Ave., Chicago, IL, 60605

Illinois Technical College was a small private junior college that specialized in teaching electronics theory and repair. The college was located in the Loop area of downtown Chicago, Illinois, United States, on Wabash Avenue. The college is no longer in operation, having closed in 1992. Records from the school are held by the Illinois State Board of Education.

== History ==
The school was founded in 1950 by Harold M. Rabin; it was originally known as the Chicago School of Television Repair, and later as the Electronics Trades Institute. In 1964, the name was changed to Electronics Technical Institute of Illinois; in 1980 the name was changed to Illinois Technical College, reflecting the school's status as a diversified training institution. When Rabin founded ITC, he owned a television repair and service business and employed a number of technicians. However, many of the "trained" technicians he encountered still needed a practical, hands-on course in television service and repair. While training technicians for his own needs, he developed a practical shop-training method which was used in ITC's television-service technician course. Over the years, Illinois Technical College grew from a single-subject vocational school to a multi-course technical college offering an approved associate degree in electro-mechanical computer engineering technology and a variety of courses at various levels of training.

== Accreditation and approvals ==
The Illinois Technical College was approved by the Illinois Office of Education and the Illinois Board of Higher Education; it was also approved by the Bureau of Indian Affairs and for veterans' training under Title 38 of the United States Code. ITC was an eligible institution under the federally insured Student Loan and Grant Program.

Illinois Technical College was an accredited member of the National Association of Trade and Technical Schools in Washington, D.C., a charter member of the Illinois Association of Trade and Technical Schools and a charter member of the Illinois Association of Accredited Schools and Colleges.

== Faculty and staff ==
ITC faculty members were selected for their technical skills, on-the-job experience and ability to make the principles of electronics understandable to their students. Each faculty member had an extensive background in electronics and electronic servicing and was an experienced, state-licensed vocational teacher possessing an up-to-date, working knowledge of electronics.

== Facilities ==
Illinois Technical College was located at 506 South Wabash Avenue in downtown Chicago. Class sizes were limited to 20 students per laboratory (or shop) and 40 students per lecture. All TV-training classrooms and shops were equipped with standard-brand color TVs and radios. These hands-on teaching workshops had a variety of test equipment used to repair televisions and radios, including oscilloscopes, voltmeters and signal generators. Several electronics labs were used to teach analog and digital electronics; these labs were equipped with electronic test equipment such as multiple-trace oscilloscopes, digital voltmeters and microcomputers. Each associate-degree student was given a portable prototyping breadboard system on which to construct electronic circuits. This patented training system was developed by ITC.

== Curriculum ==
=== Four-semester associate degree ===
- Electro-Mechanical Computer Engineering Technology (71 credit hours)

=== Three-semester certificate ===
- Electronics Technology (53 credit hours)
- Consumer Electronics and Color TV Service Technician (49 credit hours)
- Electronic Drafting Technology Program (44 credit hours)

=== Two-semester certificate ===
- Electronics Service Technician (36 credit hours)
- Consumer Electronics Technology (32 credit hours)
- Drafting Technology (30 credit hours)

== Partnership with Roosevelt University ==
Roosevelt University had an arrangement with Illinois Technical College in which students in their undergraduate program leading to a Bachelor of Science Degree in Electronics Engineering Technology (BSEET) would attend Illinois Technical College for their electronics-technology training. The program included courses from Roosevelt's College of Arts and Sciences and the Walter E. Heller College of Business Administration. Students took 56 credit hours of technical training at Illinois Technical College as part of their degree requirement; ITC was located across the street from Roosevelt University.

== Notable staff and alumni ==
- Gloria Ray Karlmark
- Edward T. Hall

== Sources ==
- 1981 Illinois Technical College Catalog
- 1991 Roosevelt University BSEET Degree Pamphlet
