= Intechcentras =

Lithuanian non-profit organisation

- Viešoji įstaiga Intechcentras
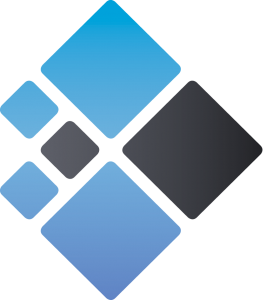

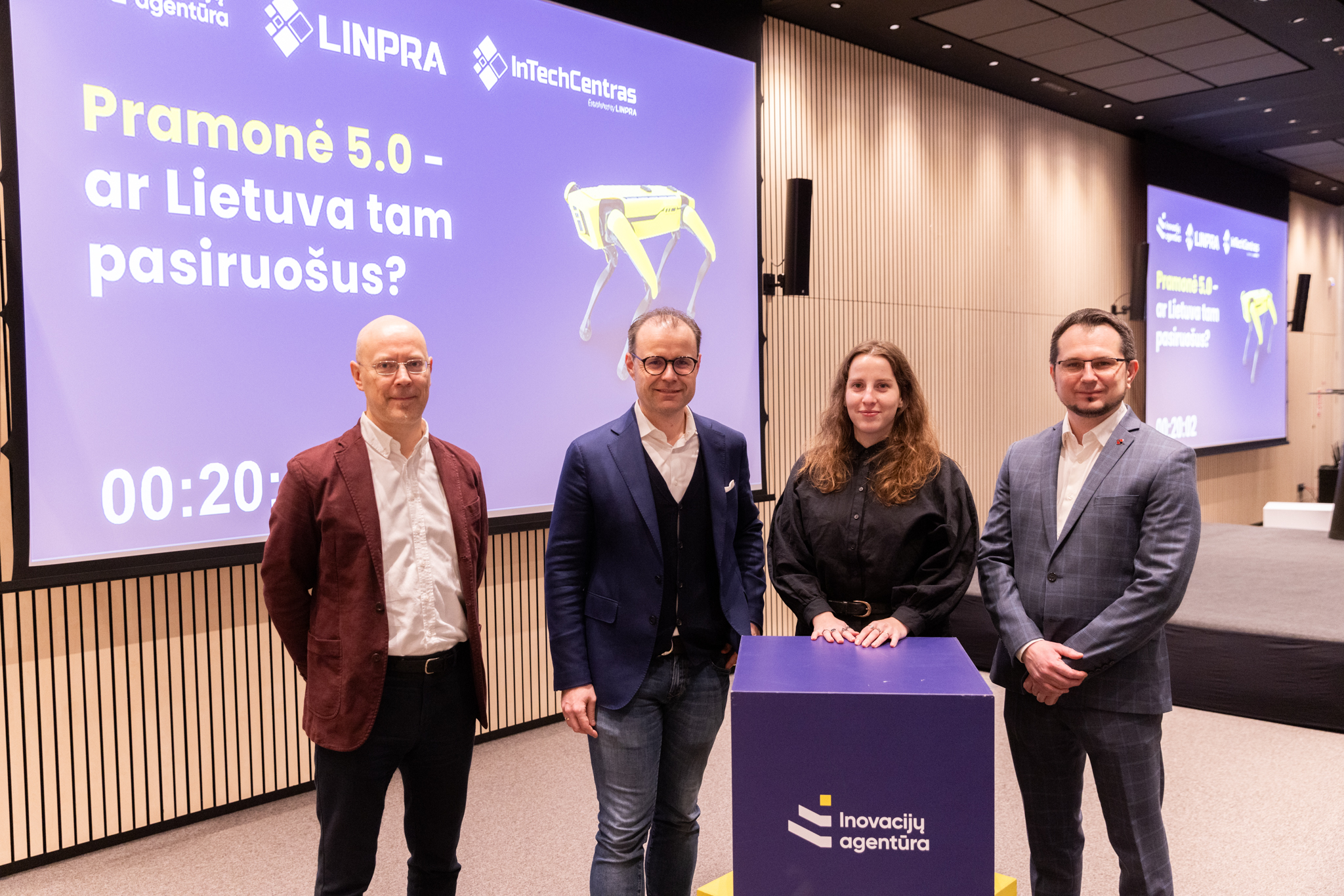
- Intechcentras presentation on EU Industry 5.0
- Abbreviation: ITC
- Formation: 2007; 19 years ago
- Type: Non-profit
- Tax ID no.: LT100004675419
- Registration no.: 301069582
- Headquarters: Vilnius, Lithuania
- Region served: European Union
- Official languages: Lithuanian, English
- Leader: Audrius Jasėnas
- Website: Official website

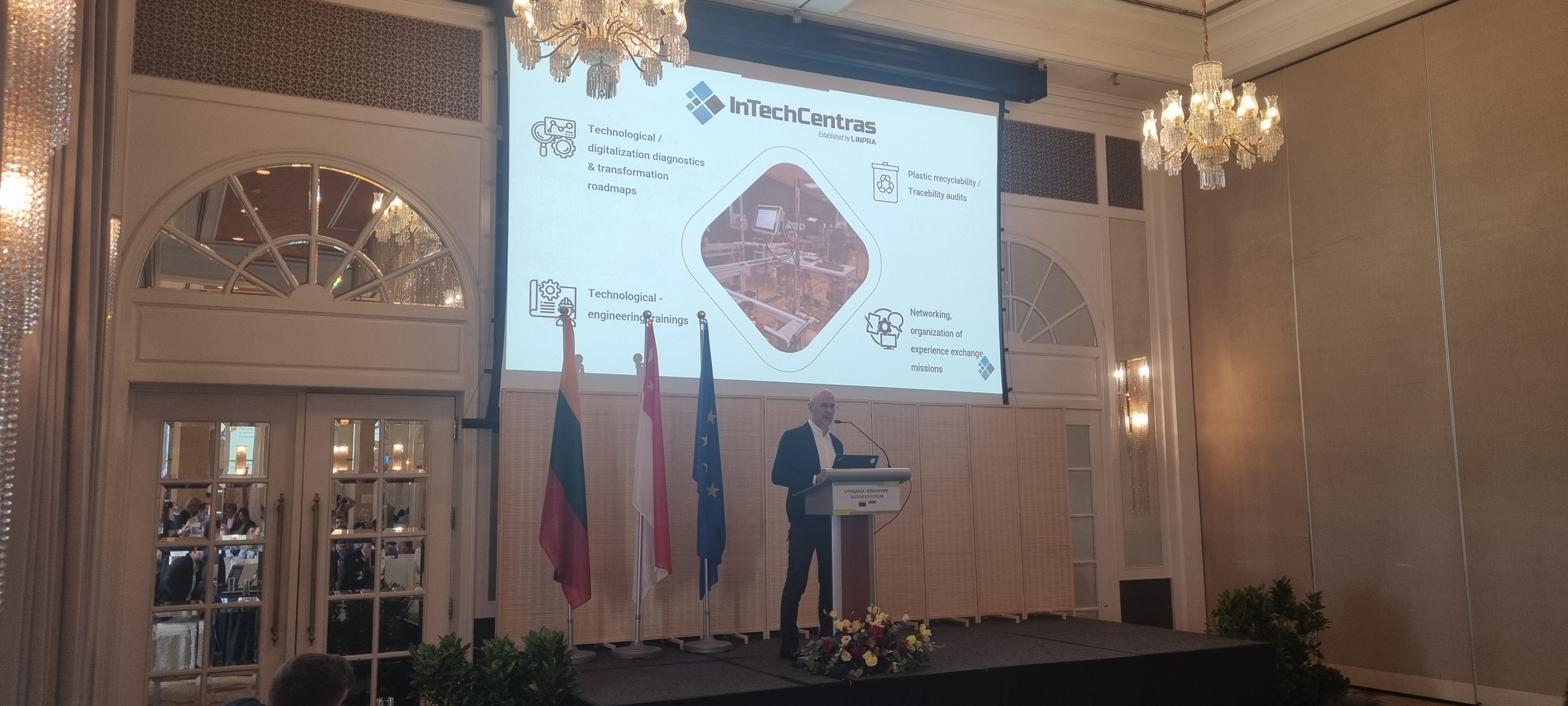
Intechcentras lecture at 2024 Lithuania - Singapore business forum

InTechCentras, commonly abbreviated ITC, is a Lithuanian organisation and Lithuania’s primary competence centre for digitisation and innovative manufacturing practices. It provides support, advisory and training services primarily aimed at advancing modern digital technologies, recycling and sustainability.

It is Lithuania's primary hub for multiple knowledge and innovation initiatives of the European Union, including EDIH, advanced manufacturing DIH and smart manufacturing competence centre. Intechcentras also partners with businesses on innovation projects and prototyping, conducts experiments and assists in R&D projects.

== Overview ==
InTechCentras was established by Linpra in 2007 with the intention to increase the competitiveness of industrial companies and promote advanced manufacturing practices. In a decade since inception, it has provided services for more than 300 industrial companies, trained several thousand professionals and arranged more than 1200 trainings. Multiple Intechcentras projects have been highlighted as success stories by the European Institute of Innovation and Technology.

== Certification body ==
Intechcentras is an accredited certification body for plastic recycling, with jurisdiction in all EU countries. Intechcentras is certified to provide plastic product recycling certification services in accordance with the "Recyclass" methodology, assessing the entire waste management chain.

== Trainings ==
InTechCentras trainings cover a variety of topics primarily within digitisation and innovation e.g. industrial digitalisation, industrial automation, innovative logistics, digital twins, energy efficiency, artificial intelligence, recycling and sustainability. Trainings are often arranged in collaboration with foreign experts.

== Partnerships ==
In its projects, InTechCentras partners with domestic and foreign organisations, including multiple universities, government agencies, ministries and EU institutions. It is a member of several industry clusters, including Laser and Engineering Technologies Cluster. Intechcentras is also an active member and partner in multiple industrial networks and research institutes, focusing on advanced manufacturing.
