= Instituto Tecnológico Córdoba =

Instituto Tecnólogico Córdoba
- Formation: 2006
- Type: Information Technology
- Headquarters: Córdoba, Argentina
- Location: Argentina
- Website: http://www.fitc.unc.edu.ar/

Instituto Tecnológico Córdoba (Technological Institute of Cordoba) was created jointly by the six universities located in Córdoba, Argentina, and Cordoba Technology Cluster (comprising over 30 IT companies), to promote technological development in the region.
