= Port of Corpus Christi =

Port in Texas, US

From 1926 when the Port of Corpus Christi was first established to recent times the Port has made many achievements and developments. Through 2023, the Port of Corpus Christi had a record 203 million tons of cargo, cementing its status as the United States' largest gateway for crude oil exports and a top exporter of liquefied natural gas (LNG).The Port of Corpus Christi’s headquarters, the Executive Administration Building, is located near the entrance the Inner Harbor (adjacent to Downtown Corpus Christi) in Nueces County. The Port operates as an independent subdivision of the State of Texas and is governed by state Navigation Code. The Port of Corpus Christi’s operations are funded without any city, county or state tax dollars .

== Government and Administration ==
The Port of Corpus Christi is governed by a seven-member Port Commission. Three port commissioners are appointed by the Nueces County Commissioners Court, three by the City of Corpus Christi and one by the San Patricio County Commissioners Court. The first port commission was appointed in 1923 with three members. They were Robert Driscoll (chairman), John W. Kellam of Robstown and W.W. Jones. In 1973, a special act of the legislature increased the number of commissioners to five, and in 1983, another special act of the legislature increased the number to seven. Environmental initiatives are handled through the Port of Corpus Christi’s Environmental Management System (EMS), while the Port of Corpus Christi Police Department oversees public safety and security within the Port’s footprint.

== History and Development ==
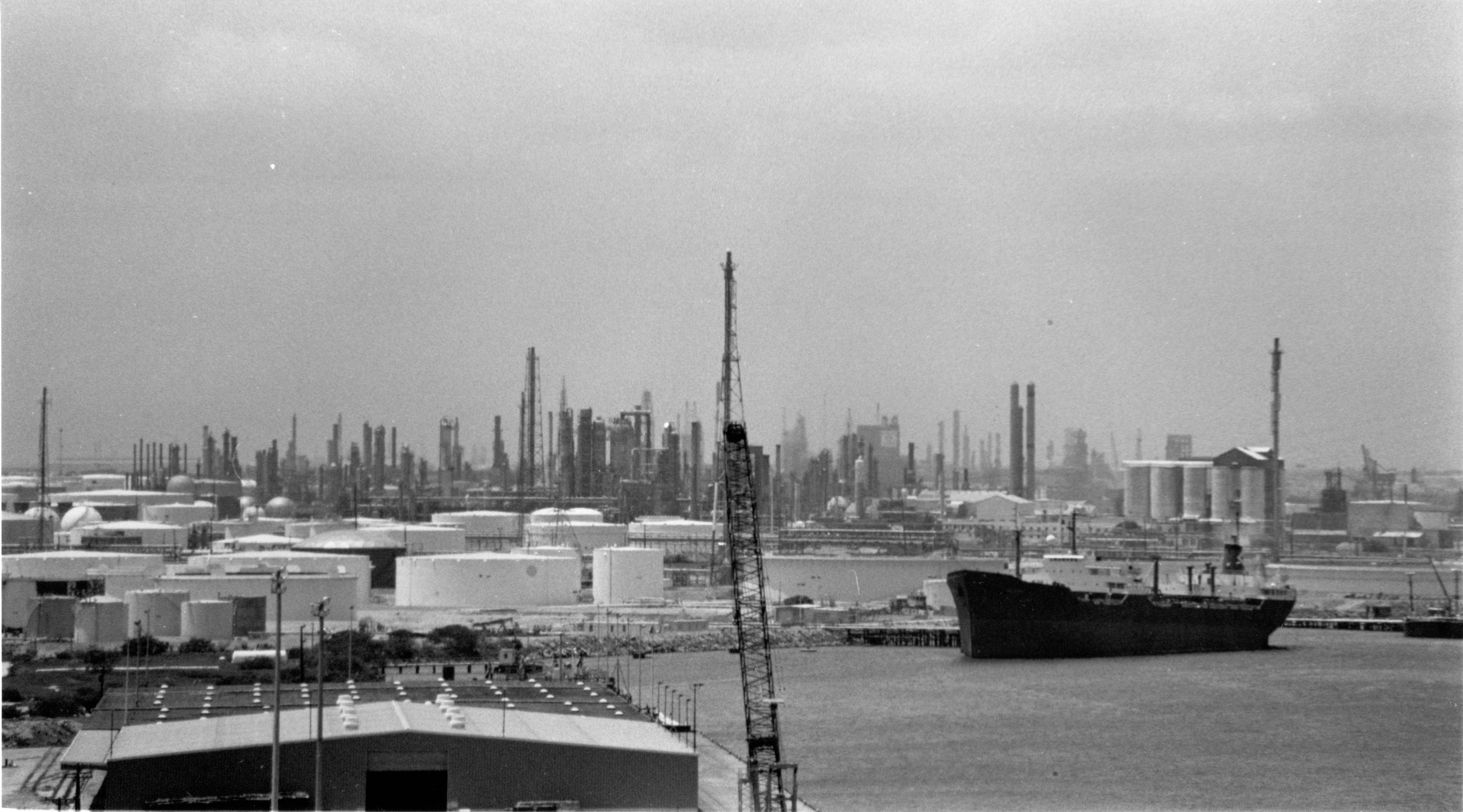
Corpus Christi Harbor as seen from the Harbor Bridge circa 1993–1997

Rene Robert Cavalier, Sieur de la Salle, is credited as the first person to see Corpus Christi. Legend has it that Alonzo Alvarez de Piñeda was the first person to sail through the bay on June 24, 1519, and named it Corpus Christi (Body of Christ) after seeing it on religious Catholic Feast Day of Corpus Christi. In the 1820s and earlier, Corpus Christi was an important spot for trading contraband goods, which were then loaded and unloaded from sailing vessels and then transported to the North of the United States and into Mexico. After some time, the area quickly became known as a city in which people could prosper.

In 1839, Colonel Henry L. Kinney opened a trading post in the city, later becoming an official landmark. With Corpus Christi now recognized as a townsite between 1844 and 1853, Corpus Christi became a city. As a smaller city compared to its present size, Kinney managed operations of business trade between the North and the South for the region. Kinney believed not only the land had such opportunity, but the bay as well. New travelers came and settled, growing the size of Corpus Christi. With more people involved, the port was finally able to be dug and transformed into a man-made bay for larger cargo ships.

The catastrophic 1919 hurricane, which slammed Corpus Christi on September 14, caused extensive damage and heavy loss of life, and underscored the necessity of improved infrastructure. Toward that end, local officials initiated steps to construct a deep-water port to increase economic vitality and security.

As the recovery from the 1919 hurricane began, efforts to establish a deep water port in Corpus Christi against the very high land that protected the city from full devastation started in earnest. Roy Miller – then-editor of the Corpus Christi Caller and future mayor of Corpus Christi – began the call for the establishment of a safe harbor in the city.

Three years later, after the voters in Nueces County gave their approval for the formation of Nueces County Navigation District No. 1, work began to build out the necessary infrastructure for the new port in Corpus Christi. The federal government allocated $5.1 million for the work, which paid for:

- A turning basin 1,200 feet wide by 3,000 feet long and 25 feet deep east of the city;
- Wharf construction, providing at first, for the berthing of seven vessels with ample provision for future expansion;
- Necessary mechanical equipment, fire protection, storage tracks and motor-truck roadways;
- Extension of partly constructed city breakwater in front of exposed face of the harbor;
- A lift bridge to carry the highway and the San Antonio and Aransas Pass Railway track across the entrance channel;
- A levee between the harbor and Nueces Bay;
- A channel 200 feet wide and 25 feet deep, with widened places for passing, connecting the terminal with deep water at Port Aransas.

A statewide celebration was held in 1926 to officially open the Port of Corpus Christi for business. The first commodity to leave the Port was cotton from Aransas Compress Company. Ten years after the Port of Corpus Christi officially opened for operations, oil overtook cotton as the primary commodity moving through the gateway. By that time, the Port’s channel had been deepened to 32 feet to accommodate the growth in cargo volumes seen over that decade.

A new industrial canal, nearly two miles in length, and turning basin had been constructed a few years prior to accommodate the Port’s first industrial customer – Southern Alkali Corporation – in the first instance of lengthening the channel toward the west. And new lighting had been installed across the entire ship channel to adequately facilitate night navigation by vessels.

In subsequent years, the channel would see additional, incremental improvements to its depth and width, while the Port of Corpus Christi also continued its expansion westward. It added a new turning basin near Tule Lake, then another stretch of channel to what would become the Viola Turning Basin.

The Corpus Christi Ship Channel’s current depth of 45 feet was completed in 1990, 22 years after the project was authorized by Congress in 1968. Shortly after the 45-froot dredging project was finished, Congress gave authorization to further study improvements to the Corpus Christi Ship Channel, including the extension and deepening of the La Quinta Channel Extension. That work was authorized in the Water Resources Development Act of 2007 and completed in 2013. As part of that 2007 authorization, Congress also set the new proposed depth of the Corpus Christi Ship Channel to 54 feet Mean Lower Low Water (MLLW).

The Port of Corpus Christi and U.S. Army Corps of Engineers entered into a Project Partnership Agreement on September 9, 2017 for construction of the main channel (widening and deepening), as well as new barge lanes. The Corpus Christi Ship Channel Improvement Project, completed in 2025, widened the channel to 530 feet and deepened it to 54 feet MLLW.

Additionally, there have been many other natural disasters to affect the Port of Corpus Christi. When Hurricane Harvey made landfall near Texas Coast on August 25, 2017 as a Category 4 storm, it caused immense destruction to the port of Corpus Christi and its facilities. While the city of Corpus Christi itself experienced relatively moderate structural damage and scattered power outages, the port infrastructure was significantly affected. The port was closed and immediately started their recovery efforts by "[recalling] Tier 2 Essential Personnel to support the recovery operations" as well as according to Tom Mylett, Director of Port Security and Incident Manager of the Incident Management Team as they continue "post Hurricane Harvey recovery, [they] are also supporting and in full communications with surrounding communities affected by the storm. [They] are augmenting the tremendous efforts of all local and first responders of the most affected areas in [the] region" (Port of Corpus Christi).

== Operations and Services ==
In 2025 The Port of Corpus Christi moved 203.4 million tons, having a 1.5% decline from 2024 moving 206.5 million tons . Then, in 2023 The Port of Corpus Christi moved over 203 million tons of cargo, with crude exports amounting to approximately 126.1 million tons—a 12.5% increase compared to the same period in the previous year . LNG exports also saw a significant rise, at 16.3 million tons—an 81.2% increase compared to 2022 . This success in LNG exports is largely driven by Cheniere Energy's Corpus Christi liquefied natural gas (LNG) Terminal, which as of February 2026, has been approved for a 12% expansion in LNG exports.

That shipment was aboard the Theo T tanker, which carried crude oil overseas from NuStar Energy LP’s dockside facility in the Port of Corpus Christi. The Port of Corpus Christi, as of August 2022, holds roughly 60 percent of the U.S. crude oil market share.

In 2025, the annual tonnage by commodity group for the Port of Corpus Christi was:

Rank	Commodity	Tonnage
1	Crude Oil	127,436,981 tons
2	Petroleum	62,453,244 tons
3	Dry Bulk	8,129,763 tons
4	Chemical	3,139,090 tons
5	Bulk Grain	1,432,517 tons
6	Liquid Bulk	466,969 tons
7	Break Bulk	321,673 tons

== Environmental Impact ==
The Corpus Christi Port received Green Marine certification in 2016 and then advanced to Level 5 in all applicable program areas by 2023. In 2020, the port received a $471,324 grant from the U.S. Environmental Protection Agency (EPA) to implement a trash skimming program aimed at reducing waterborne trash . Additionally, in 2024, the EPA granted the port $105 million under the Clean Ports Program for zero-emission equipment and infrastructure initiatives .

The Port of Corpus Christi has voluntarily purchased electricity from 100% renewable sources since 2017 and has also been an Environmental Protection Agency Green Power Partner since 2021.

Since 2006, the Port of Corpus Christi has recycled a variety of materials, including: 1,266,122 pounds of paper, cardboard, and metal; 65,319 gallons of used oil and anti-freeze; and 18,188 electronic components and light bulbs.

The Port of Corpus Christi has been a strong supporter during the conversion of the Coastal Bend Air Quality Partnership (CBAQP) by contributing $270,000 over the next three years ($90,000 annually) in addition to other in-kind services like legal and office space. The Port of Corpus Christi also provided technical assistance with developing and implementing the CBAQP Strategic Plan, which includes development of an action plan to maintain and improve air quality in the region.

Other contributions by the Port of Corpus Christi include contributing $125,000 annually to the Texas A&M-Pollution Prevention Partnership for operation of the AutoCheck Program and other related outreach; contributing $165,000 annually to the Coastal Bend Bays and Estuaries Program for implementation of the Bays Plan; and undertaking an effort in partnership with Ducks Unlimited to identify, prioritize, permit and design beneficial reuse opportunities for dredge material.

Additionally, the Port of Corpus Christi is maintaining a trash skimming device in the Salt Flats Ditch to collect and monitor trash in rain runoff from urbanized areas that otherwise would have gone into Corpus Christi Bay. The trash skimmer was funded through an EPA Trash Free Waterways grant, with the program also including a trash awareness campaign to eliminate sources of trash in the runoff.

The Port of Corpus Christi is also campaigning to raise awareness and reduce litter at its Harbor Island property in cooperation with several local entities, including the City of Aransas Pass Code Enforcement and CBBEP Up2U campaign (also an EPA Trash Free Waterways funded project).

The Port of Corpus Christi is initiating a pilot program at its Avery Point Dock complex through a $1 million grant received in 2021 from the Texas Commission on Environmental Quality to identify emission control strategies for vessels at berth.

The Port of Corpus Christi is also in the midst of implementing a Clean Fleet Program to convert its vehicular fleet to lower emissions vehicles, as well as contributing $2.5 million for construction of the Texas State Aquarium’s new Port of Corpus Christi Center for Wildlife Rescue. The Texas State Aquarium also pulls water for its exhibit directly from Corpus Christi Bay, a testament to the water quality the Port of Corpus Christi has long worked proactively to protect.

On December 24th 2022 there was an oil spill cause by a pipeline failure from dock #5 owned by flint hills resources crude oil terminal. Approximately 14,000 gallons of light crude oil was released into the Corpus Christi Bay. Response crews from flint hills resources and third party contractors, working with local and federal agencies, assessed shorelines, and contained, and collected crude oil residue. Federal and State Natural Resources trustees, led by the NOAA, assessed injury to marsh and sandy beach shorelines as well as wildlife such as birds, and sea turtles. In May 2024 the U.S. Department of Justice approves a settlement in which Flint Hills Resources paid $427,000 for natural resources restoration.
