= Grade I listed buildings in Norwich =

There are over 9,000 Grade I listed buildings in England. This page is a list of these buildings in the city of Norwich in the county of Norfolk.

== Buildings ==
Name	Location	Type	Completed (Note: The date given is the date used by Historic England as significant for the initial building or that of an important part in the structure's description.)	Date designated	Grid ref. (Note: The grid reference is based on the British national grid reference system, sometimes known as OSGB36, used by the Ordnance Survey.) Geo-coordinates	Entry number (Note: The "List Entry Number" is a unique number assigned to each listed building and scheduled monument by Historic England.)	Image
All Saints Church	Norwich	Parish Church	15th century	26 February 1954	TG2314408229; 52°37′33″N 1°17′44″E	1051797	All Saints Church More images
Museum of Norwich at the Bridewell	Norwich	House	15th century	26 February 1954	TG2310908693; 52°37′48″N 1°17′43″E	1280532	Museum of Norwich at the Bridewell More images
Carrow Abbey	Norwich	House	Late 19th century	26 May 1954	TG2421707390; 52°37′05″N 1°18′39″E	1205742	Carrow Abbey More images
Church of St Andrew	Norwich	Tower	1467–1498	26 February 1954	TG2310908716; 52°37′49″N 1°17′43″E	1051891	Church of St Andrew More images
Church of St Augustine	Norwich	Tower	1726	26 February 1954	TG2288109474; 52°38′14″N 1°17′33″E	1051896	Church of St Augustine More images
St Clement Colegate	Colegate, Norwich	Church	1450	26 February 1954	TG2317909044; 52°38′00″N 1°17′48″E	1051282	St Clement Colegate More images
Church of St Etheldreda	Norwich	Parish Church/Art Studio	12th century	26 February 1954	TG2364107933; 52°37′23″N 1°18′10″E	1051209	Church of St Etheldreda More images
Church of St George	Tombland, Norwich	Church	c. 1445	26 February 1954	TG2331008835; 52°37′53″N 1°17′54″E	1051809	Church of St George More images
Church of St George	Colegate, Norwich	Church	1458	26 February 1954	TG2299509032; 52°38′00″N 1°17′38″E	1206500	Church of St George More images
Church of St Giles	Norwich	Tower	Early 15th century	26 February 1954	TG2256508599; 52°37′46″N 1°17′14″E	1051876	Church of St Giles More images
Church of St Helen	Norwich	Tower	1375	26 February 1954	TG2373309020; 52°37′58″N 1°18′17″E	1051367	Church of St Helen More images
Church of St John the Baptist	Timberhill, Norwich	Parish Church	11th century	28 March 1972	TG2318608258; 52°37′34″N 1°17′46″E	1290337	Church of St John the Baptist More images
Church of St John de Sepulchre (St John the Theologian)	Norwich	Parish Church	15th century	26 February 1954	TG2346407762; 52°37′18″N 1°18′00″E	1280767	Church of St John de Sepulchre (St John the Theologian) More images
Church of St John Maddermarket	Norwich	Parish Church	14th century	26 February 1954	TG2293608666; 52°37′48″N 1°17′34″E	1372509	Church of St John Maddermarket More images
Church of St Julian	Norwich	Parish Church	12th century	26 February 1954	TG2349508124; 52°37′29″N 1°18′02″E	1051852	Church of St Julian More images
Church of St Laurence	Norwich	Parish Church	15th century	26 February 1954	TG2275108784; 52°37′52″N 1°17′24″E	1372459	Church of St Laurence More images
Church of St Martin at Oak	Norwich	Hostel	1954	26 February 1954	TG2273709200; 52°38′05″N 1°17′25″E	1051925	Church of St Martin at Oak More images
Church of St Mary	Earlham, Norwich	Parish Church	12th century	26 February 1954	TG1904408292; 52°37′41″N 1°14′06″E	1372778	Church of St Mary More images
Church of St Mary Plain	Norwich	Church (redundant)	Early 11th century	26 February 1954	TG2282509131; 52°38′03″N 1°17′29″E	1372513	Church of St Mary Plain More images
Church of St Mary the Less	Norwich	Parish Church	13th century	26 February 1954	TG2331008750; 52°37′50″N 1°17′54″E	1051918	Church of St Mary the Less More images
Church of St Michael at Plea	Norwich	Parish Church	15th century	26 February 1954	TG2323508742; 52°37′50″N 1°17′50″E	1051880	Church of St Michael at Plea More images
Church of St Michael Coslany	Norwich	Tower	c. 1425	26 February 1954	TG2282808996; 52°37′59″N 1°17′29″E	1372474	Church of St Michael Coslany More images
Church of St Peter Mancroft	Norwich	Parish Church	15th century	26 February 1954	TG2293208426; 52°37′40″N 1°17′33″E	1210490	Church of St Peter Mancroft More images
Church of St Peter Parmentergate	Norwich	Parish Church	Late 15th century	26 February 1954	TG2339108373; 52°37′38″N 1°17′57″E	1372808	Church of St Peter Parmentergate More images
Church of St Simon and St Jude	Norwich	Parish Church	14th century	5 June 1972	TG2325408916; 52°37′55″N 1°17′52″E	1051274	Church of St Simon and St Jude More images
Church of St Stephen	Norwich	Tower	16th century	26 February 1954	TG2292108294; 52°37′36″N 1°17′32″E	1051920	Church of St Stephen More images
Churchman House	Norwich	House/Register Office	c. 1730	26 February 1954	TG2258008550; 52°37′45″N 1°17′15″E	1051844	Churchman House More images
Cinema City	Norwich	House	Early C20	26 May 1954	TG2315008732; 52°37′50″N 1°17′46″E	1220477	Cinema City More images
Bishop's Palace	Norwich	Bishops Palace	11th century onwards	26 February 1954	TG2345808967; 52°37′57″N 1°18′02″E	1372759	Bishop's Palace More images
Bishop's Gate	Norwich	Gateway/Porters Lodge	c. 1436	5 June 1972	TG2349809057; 52°38′00″N 1°18′05″E	1051328	Bishop's Gate More images
Church of St Martin at Palace Plain	Norwich	Church	11th century	26 February 1954	TG2347709108; 52°38′01″N 1°18′04″E	1372511	Church of St Martin at Palace Plain More images
Saint James the Less, Pockthorpe	Norwich	Puppet theatre	15th–16th century	26 May 1954	TG2341509358; 52°38′09″N 1°18′01″E	1372521	Saint James the Less, Pockthorpe More images
Former Church of St Saviour	Norwich	Sports Centre	1954	26 February 1954	TG2318609257; 52°38′06″N 1°17′49″E	1372838	Former Church of St Saviour More images
Music House	Norwich	House	12th century	26 February 1954	TG2362808041; 52°37′27″N 1°18′09″E	1217907	Music House More images
Surrey House (Aviva plc, formerly Norwich Union)	Norwich	Balustrade	1903-4	5 June 1972	TG2304808147; 52°37′31″N 1°17′39″E	1210553	Surrey House (Aviva plc, formerly Norwich Union) More images
Old Meeting House	Norwich	Meeting House	1693	26 February 1954	TG2310409107; 52°38′02″N 1°17′44″E	1206474	Old Meeting House More images
Cloisters including West Wall of Former Chapter House (?) at the Great Hospital	Norwich	Wall	c. 1450	26 February 1954	TG2373309041; 52°37′59″N 1°18′17″E	1280660	Cloisters including West Wall of Former Chapter House (?) at the Great Hospital More images
Former Chaplain's House at the Great Hospital	Norwich	Apartment	1986	26 February 1954	TG2368009063; 52°37′59″N 1°18′14″E	1205562	Former Chaplain's House at the Great Hospital More images
Part of the Former Master's House at the Great Hospital	Norwich	Apartment	1986	26 February 1954	TG2372809049; 52°37′59″N 1°18′17″E	1205544	Upload Photo
Part of the Former Master's House at the Great Hospital	Norwich	House	17th century	26 February 1954	TG2371009053; 52°37′59″N 1°18′16″E	1051368	Upload Photo
Refectory and Part of Former Master's House at the Great Hospital	Norwich	Office	1986	26 February 1954	TG2371109035; 52°37′59″N 1°18′16″E	1372739	Upload Photo
Norwich Arts Centre (formerly St Swithins church)	Norwich	Arts Centre	1986	26 February 1954	TG2258808832; 52°37′54″N 1°17′16″E	1220682	Norwich Arts Centre (formerly St Swithins church) More images
Remains of St Benedict's Church	Norwich	Parish Church	11th century	26 February 1954	TG2247908777; 52°37′52″N 1°17′10″E	1051867	Remains of St Benedict's Church More images
Roman Catholic Cathedral of St John the Baptist	Norwich	Church	1882–1910	26 February 1954	TG2233508547; 52°37′45″N 1°17′02″E	1051299	Roman Catholic Cathedral of St John the Baptist More images
St Andrew's and Blackfriars Halls	Norwich	Art School	1899	26 February 1954	TG2315308810; 52°37′52″N 1°17′46″E	1220456	St Andrew's and Blackfriars Halls More images
St Edmunds Church	Norwich	Parish Church (redundant)	15th century	5 June 1972	TG2333509164; 52°38′03″N 1°17′56″E	1051279	St Edmunds Church More images
St Gregory's Church	Norwich	Parish Church/Arts Centre.	14th century	26 February 1954	TG2284508711; 52°37′49″N 1°17′29″E	1210298	St Gregory's Church More images
St James' Works (Jarrold's Printing Works)	Norwich	Factory	1954	26 February 1954	TG2347609246; 52°38′06″N 1°18′04″E	1051798	St James' Works (Jarrold's Printing Works) More images
St Margaret's Church	Norwich	Parish Church/gymnasium	14th century	25 February 1954	TG2265708812; 52°37′53″N 1°17′20″E	1051898	St Margaret's Church More images
St Peter Hungate Museum	Norwich	Museum	1954	26 February 1954	TG2321008803; 52°37′52″N 1°17′49″E	1220104	St Peter Hungate Museum More images
Strangers' Hall Museum	Norwich	House	Late 15th century	26 February 1954	TG2289208726; 52°37′50″N 1°17′32″E	1372755	Strangers' Hall Museum More images
The Assembly Rooms	Norwich	Apartment	1954	26 February 1954	TG2280608299; 52°37′36″N 1°17′26″E	1051836	The Assembly Rooms More images
The Castle	Norwich	Castle	Late 12th century	26 February 1954	TG2318708527; 52°37′43″N 1°17′47″E	1372724	The Castle More images
The Cathedral of the Holy and Undivided Trinity	Norwich	Chapter House	11th century	26 February 1954	TG2347608911; 52°37′55″N 1°18′03″E	1051330	The Cathedral of the Holy and Undivided Trinity More images
St Ethelbert's Gate	Norwich	Gate	c. 1316	26 February 1954	TG2340008762; 52°37′50″N 1°17′59″E	1206324	St Ethelbert's Gate More images
Erpingham Gate	Norwich	Gate	1420	5 June 1972	TG2335608875; 52°37′54″N 1°17′57″E	1372788	Erpingham Gate More images
The Deanery, Priors Hall and Adjoining Boundary Wall to South West	Norwich	Deanery	13th century	26 February 1954	TG2353908849; 52°37′53″N 1°18′06″E	1206422	The Deanery, Priors Hall and Adjoining Boundary Wall to South West More images
The Guildhall	Norwich	Guildhall	15th century	26 February 1954	TG2292008560; 52°37′44″N 1°17′33″E	1187384	The Guildhall More images
The Old Barge	Norwich	Exchange	14th century	26 February 1954	TG2354908184; 52°37′31″N 1°18′05″E	1051236	The Old Barge More images
Carnary Chapel (Chapel of St John the Evangelist)	Norwich	Chapel	1316	26 February 1954	TG2338208898; 52°37′55″N 1°17′58″E	1051315	Carnary Chapel (Chapel of St John the Evangelist) More images
69 The Close (Norwich School)	Norwich	Timber Framed House/School Office	Pre 17th century	5 June 1972	TG2339408906; 52°37′55″N 1°17′59″E	1051314	69 The Close (Norwich School) More images
70 The Close (Norwich School)	Norwich	School	1954	26 February 1954	TG2336008891; 52°37′54″N 1°17′57″E	1206438	70 The Close (Norwich School) More images
