= St Margaret Westwick =

- St Margaret Westwick's south face in 2026
- St Margaret Westwick
- 52°37′53″N 1°17′20″E
- OS grid reference: TG 22657 08812
- Location: Norwich, Norfolk
- Country: England
- Denomination: Church of England
- Website: stmargaretsgallery.co.uk

History
- Dedication: St Margaret of Antioch

Architecture
- Functional status: Redundant
- Heritage designation: Grade I listed
- Closed: 1975

St Margaret Westwick is a medieval Grade I listed redundant parish church in Norwich. Located between St Benedict's Street and Westwick Street in the historic Norwich ward of Westwick, it was one of three churches in the city dedicated to Saint Margaret of Antioch before the other two were demolished in the 16th century. It features a rectangular west tower connected to a nave and chancel which have a south aisle and chapel and north and south porches.

In 1209, which marks the earliest documentary reference to the church, it was given to Hickling Priory in a confirmation of rights by Pope Innocent III, and through the Middle Ages its advowson passed hands between various laymen. The lords of Yoxford in Suffolk took it over in the 14th century until 1428, after which extensive building work was done on the church. The 19th century saw strong influence in the church fro the Oxford Movement. Following its closure in 1975, it became a gymnasium and then an exhibition space. Since 2025, it has been known as St Margaret's Gallery.

== History ==
Archaeological evidence suggests that there was Anglo-Scandinavian activity in the area of the church site prior to the Norman Conquest. The church is medieval, and is dedicated to Saint Margaret of Antioch, being one of 58 medieval dedications to this saint in Norfolk and one of three in Norwich, the others being the since-demolished St Margaret Combust and St Margaret Newbridge. Its suffix 'Westwick' refers to its position in the Norwich ward of Westwick.

The earliest known reference to the church comes from a confirmation of rights by Pope Innocent III that gave it to Hickling Priory, an Augustinian priory also in Norfolk, in 1209. The Valuation of Norwich, dated to 1254, also mentions St Margaret Westwick, assessing it at 15s; 5s was to be kept by the rector with the rest being divided equally among Hickling Priory's canons and the nuns of St George's in Thetford. Though there was interest in the parish by monastic elites, the church's advowson remained in the possession of laymen through the middle ages. The earliest known of these laymen was Thomas, son of Mabel who was daughter of Isabell le Cauz; he sold the advowson in 1286 to the son of Warine le Gros of Wood Norton, Geoffrey of Norton, who was rector in 1300. This rector was supported by two stipendiary priests. By the end of the 13th century, the parish of St Margaret Westwick was developed as an urban area. From the 14th century until 1428, the church was owned by the lords of Yoxford in Suffolk.

=== 1428–1975: Significant building work and modern history ===
When John Norwich, the last male heir in the Yoxford line, died, new lords took it over including Sir John Fastolf. Much work was done on the church's architecture in the second quarter of the 15th century; Ayers et al have put forward that this work "should be seen as an ambitious and coherent modernisation." They have additionally suggested that the work may have been funded by Fastolf, the widow Margaret Ampulford who was buried in the nave in 1467, and husband and wife Robert Inglose and Eleanor Jenny, who have monuments in the church dated to 1475 and 1494 respectively. In the 1540s, both the other churches dedicated to Saint Margaret were demolished, leaving St Margaret Westwick as the only surviving church in the city with this dedication.

18th century antiquarian Francis Blomefield extensively listed the historical rectors and patrons of the church from the 14th century until 1536. The church saw strong influence by the Oxford Movement; it was closed for five or six years and reopened after a restoration in 1868, which replaced all of its fittings in a perceived medieval style. Services were observed with a simpler use of English. In 1954, the church became a Grade I listed building. The stained glass in the east window was replaced in 1967 with an Ascension scene by Michael King.

=== 1975–present: redundancy and St Margaret's Gallery ===
The church building now operates as an art gallery

The church saw closure in 1975. It saw, for a short time, use as a gymnasium, though this did not have any facilities. The Norwich Historic Churches Trust administered the church as an affordable exhibition space by the name of St Margaret's Church of Art.

In 2020, Historic England added the church to its Heritage at Risk Register. A restoration programme funded by Historic England repaired its roof, masonry and drainage while also tending to issues in the south transept and east chancel walls. The funding totalled £500,000 on top of an initial £45,000 for. As a result, St Margaret Westwick was removed from the register in 2024. Following a failed attempt to turn the church into a piano bar that year due to unexpected discoveries in its architecture, the church returned to its former use of showcasing art in 2025, becoming St Margaret's Gallery which is run by the Norwich Makers and Artists Collective.

== Architecture ==
The church's current architecture is from the 14th and 15th centuries, taking place in piecemeal instances of construction. The extent of this construction was limited by the space available. It largely consists of flint with stone and brick dressings, which form a nave and chancel which have a south aisle and chapel, north and south porches, and a west tower. Its roof is made of slate.

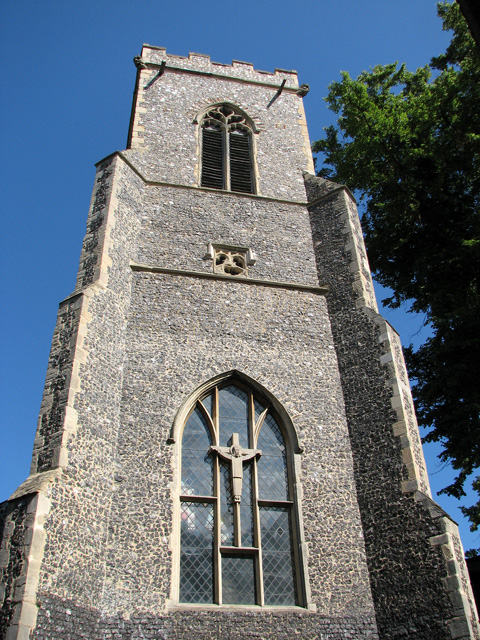
The church tower with its lower west window, sound holes, and upper belfry window

Started in c. 1420–30, The church's tower is of four stages, with its first three featuring diagonal buttresses. The fact that the buttresses stop prior to the belfry stage gives the tower a distinctive shape. Additionally, the eastern tower buttresses are not directly at the tower corners and are at the usual 135° angle to the adjacent wall surfaces for this type of buttress, instead being placed further west and splayed such that they make room for the nave, likely a result of limited east-west space for the church. There is a west door and window at its base, which are from the 20th century. The jambs of the window have the same mouldings as the nave windows, dating it to c. 1430–40, though its tracery is more modern. The wall around the door has carefully laid flint, possibly laid under supervision of the same mason who supervised the construction of St Giles on the Hill around 1420. The flint becomes far less uniform above the west window's sill. Moving upward, there are square sound holes, which feature mouchettes. The top section of the tower has a rectangular plan. There are two-light windows in the belfry that feature Decorated tracery, similar to St Martin at Oak's north nave windows and likely finished prior to 1440. These windows have an ogee quatrefoil with 'hugging' mouchettes. The tower's parapet is crenellated. Inside the tower is a gallery dated to 1707, which was created from the church's old communion rails.

The church's nave is wide, and was probably expanded compared to the original nave. It likely also became longer over time, probably meeting its present length by c. 1420–30 following the construction of the tower. It was likely built later than the tower, or widened later, as it crushes one of the buttresses on the tower. On the north side, there is a rood-stair turret.

St Margaret's 19th-century east window

The chancel likely sits atop the foundations of an earlier version. Of modest size, it is of two bays, and has three-light windows with four-centre arches and cusped intersecting tracery. The east window is from the 19th century, and is three-light. Below it is an arch of about 1.8 by 0.9 metres (5.9 by 3.0 ft) which has been blocked with brick; this appears to have been an unusually placed doorway which may have given private pew access. There is a Victorian vestry positioned on the chancel's north side.

There is a south porch which is crammed far to the west end of the south aisle, possibly having been added earlier than the aisle itself, though likely soon after the tower. It is of two storeys, which is unusual for Norwich. Its mason was likely James Woodruff (d. 1450–1) who worked on the churches at Wiveton and Great Cressingham, and the porches at the nearby St Mary Coslany and St George Colegate are similar in form, Woodruff being buried in the latter church. This porch has attached shafts as well as a two-centre arch on its outer door, featuring carved spandrels; these depict Saint Margaret, as well as another figure, among branches. On the porch's first floor it has a central ogee niche for a statue, either side of which are square-headed windows. The interior of this porch features simple tierceron star vaulting. The north porch is far more simple than the south porch.

The south aisle to the church was added later than the nave and chancel, though still in the 15th century. It is of cheaper construction than the rest of the church. The part of the aisle attached to the chancel and to the nave are likely of different construction, as the nave section has a string course which continues onto its east face but not onto the chancel aisle, which also has a lower roof line. The aisle features two four-light perpendicular windows with four-centre arches. In the south aisle, the roof has spandrels that involve wheel tracery. The south chancel chapel, in existence by 1512 though possibly constructed by the late 15th century, is accessible through a small door in the nave's east end, though this is unneeded as after the chancel chapel was built, the wall separating it from the rest of the aisle was demolished. The chapel likely saw dedication to Saint Anne, and is of cheap construction with simple three-light windows that feature four-centred arch heads and little cusping, like the east window.

Inside the church, there is an arcade of two four-centre arches; the arcade piers, made of plastered brick during the construction of the south aisle, are octagonal, though have concave sides and rounded corners which are similar to those in St Laurence's nearby, though St Laurence's are made of cut stone which would have been more expensive. The eastern respond of the arcade has an opening which may have been a squint. They are also replicated in the pillars in the chancel aisle. There are interior arches to both the chancel and tower. The old nave roof was kept when the aisles were constructed, and the bays of the arcade do not match up with the roof's arch braces; in two instances, the lower parts of these braces were cut back to make room for the arcade. The roof has a shallow pitch, and is single butt-purlin, featuring curved braces which appear from wall posts in turn supported by corbels. The nave roof, however, is boarded over, whereas the chancel roof is plastered.

== Plate, furnishings and monuments ==
Church plate in St Margaret's was partially donated by Simon and Joan Clere, who died a month apart, in their 1507 wills. Whereas Simon gave a pair of chalices upon which he willed for his and his wife's names to be inscribed, which were worth 5 marks or £3 6s 8d, Joan gave a cross also worth £3 6s 8d. In 1547, the parishioners allowed the church plate to be sold which earned a total of £50. In 1406, parishioners gifted to the church a set of vestments of decorated gold, red and white cloth, and in 1418 they gifted two noted antiphoners.

The former reredos of the church above the south door, showing Moses and Aaron with the Ten Commandments

St Margaret's font, now in St Leodegar's church in Wyberton, Lincolnshire, is from the 14th century. It has an octagonal bowl that is decorated with shields in quatrefoils surrounded by circles on each face, and eight shafts around its stem. It was in the church as late as 1930 when it was photographed by George Plunkett. In 1865, it was found that a small ornamented fragment of the chancel screen may have been used in "re-pewing" the church. The medieval parish chest from the church is made from Baltic oak and is in a group of seven 'Kentish' chests which may be from the same source, others existing in Litcham, Norfolk and in Sedlescombe, East Sussex. After 1942 air raids, this chest was removed from the church and is now with the Norfolk Museums Service. Most of the furnishings in the church, including the font, were removed and given to other churches by its 1975 closure. On one wall is the remains of an early carving of the Crucifixion of Jesus. The former church reredos, dating to the 18th century, has since been moved above the south door; it depicts the Ten Commandments, as well as Moses and Aaron. It saw conservation in 2008. The church had an organ which came to St Margaret's from St Gregory's in 1882, and now resides in the church in Little Barningham.

There are three 18th-century wall monuments to Brown family members. There is also a monument to Ann Rede (d. 1577) in the form of a low tomb chest in the chancel aisle.

== Churchyard and parish ==
The churchyard is bounded by Westwick Street to the north, St Margaret's Alley to the east, St Benedict’s Street to the south, and St Margaret's Lane to the west. This forms an area of 0.5 acres (2,000 m^{2}), which slopes by around 3 metres (9.8 ft) south to north. At the north end of the churchyard is an open area, St Margaret's Plain, which would have been wider in the 18th century, and may have been associated with the textile trade in the area in the 13th and 14th centuries. At the northern end of St Margaret's Alley on its east side, there was a single-room almshouse.

The church's parish is narrow on its east-west axis, being bounded by the parishes of St Laurence and St Swithin here, by the River Wensum on the north, and mostly by Pottergate on the south, though an area of half an acre does extend past this street.
