= St Mary the Less, Norwich =

St Mary the Less
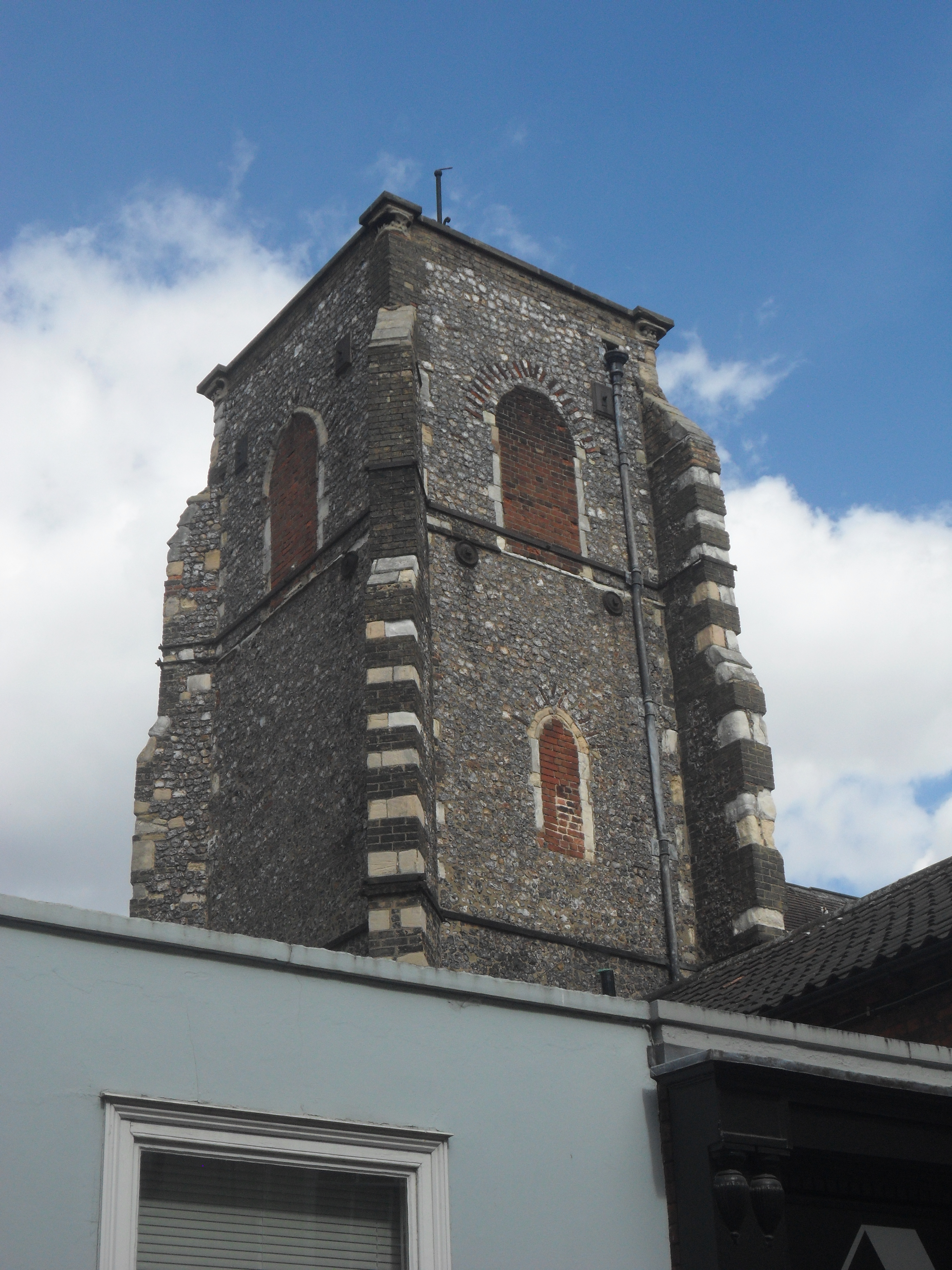
- The tower of St Mary the Less in 2013
- St Mary the Less
- 52°37′49.8″N 1°17′54.24″E
- OS grid reference: TG 23310 08750
- Location: Queen Street, Norwich, Norfolk
- Country: England
- Denomination: Church of England
- Website: norwichfrenchchurchcharity.org.uk

History
- Status: Redundant
- Dedication: St Mary

Architecture
- Heritage designation: Grade I listed
- Designated: 26 February 1954

Specifications
- Length: 22.5 metres (74 ft)

St Mary the Less is a Grade I listed redundant church located in Norwich, England. It is on the north side of Queen Street (formerly Red Well Street) near the street's junction with Tombland.

Likely existing pre-Norman Conquest and first documented in 1155, it became redundant in 1542, though from 1564 the Elizabethan Strangers were granted use of the building as a cloth exchange and from 1623 a place to sell worsted yarn. In 1637 it became a French Church for Walloon and French Protestants, until its sale to the Swedenborgians in 1832. It was a Catholic Apostolic Church until 1959, then a furniture warehouse until 1985. The church is now privately owned and surrounded by modern buildings. Since 2008, it has been on the Heritage at Risk Register due to its high vulnerability to decay.

== Dedication and naming ==
The church is dedicated to the Virgin Mary, one of about 200 of these dedications in Norfolk, and one of four that were in Norwich (St Mary Coslany, St Mary Unbrent and St Mary in the Marsh). From the 13th century, it had the suffix 'the less' or the Latin parva to denote its smaller size and lesser importance at the time compared to St Mary in the Marsh, then located some 120 metres (130 yd) to the east. It may have otherwise referred to the college of St Mary in the Field in the city, also known as St Mary the Great. St Mary the Less was also referred to as St Mary's at the Monastery Gates.

== History ==
Though there is no evidence of the church pre-Norman Conquest, it likely existed beforehand. In the 1155 charter for the Norwich Cathedral priory, the church was first recorded as (Ecclesiastica) Sancte Marie. The church began to be served by a parochial chaplain after its rectory was appropriated to the cathedral priory's infirmary. From as soon as 1313, the church was administered alongside St Cuthbert's church, and this association is reiterated by a 1368 archdeacon's return of an inventory of St Mary's church goods. In 1429, Johanna Clifland, the wife of William Clifland of St Mary the Less, testified in the heresy trial of the Lollard Margery Baxter.

In 1492, a formal union between St Mary's and St Cuthbert's was put into effect. From 1512 to 1516, the infirmarer's rolls recorded no income for the church, likely the result of a fire for which there is evidence in the building. The church tower may have been repaired after this before 1530. In 1538, the west side of the churchyard was rented out to city alderman Robert Ferrour for development. In 1542, a 13-foot-wide tenement formerly part of the east side of the churchyard was acquired by the city; this had been granted by the Bishop of Norwich to glover Elfred de Bromholm and cutler Benedict de Hapesburgh in 1269.

=== 1542–1637: Redundancy and use in the cloth industry ===
St Mary the Less became redundant in 1542; its parish was absorbed by St George's, Tombland and the building was acquired by the city. In 1564, the Norwich city council fitted out St Mary the Less as a Bay Hall, or sealing hall. The council assigned it to 24 Dutch masters, the first of the Elizabethan Strangers in Norwich, eighteen of whom were involved in the textile trade, so the Flemish bay-makers could "search and seal their bayes". Once further textile workers arrived in Norwich in 1567, St Mary the Less acted as infrastructure for the city's cloth trade. The building proved inadequate for its full original purpose, and went on to only be used for the 'raw pearch', or the searching for woven yet unfinished cloth bays, whereas the 'white pearch', of finished bays was moved to the New Hall and other sites took on the process of searching and sale halls. The church became a wool hall or cloth exchange where the Dutch merchants sold cloth, and by 1623, it became a hall for the sale particularly of worsted yarn.

=== 1637–1959: A church for various denominations ===
In 1637, it was taken over by the Walloon Company, and was converted into a church for Walloon and French Protestants, l’Église Protestante Française de Norwich (the French Church, Norwich). The Walloons had formerly been permitted in the redundant Bishop's Chapel in the cathedral grounds, but were asked to move to St Mary the Less instead. In 1685, the Revocation of the Edict of Nantes led to French Protestants leaving their homes, some for England, and this led to a bolstering of the size of St Mary the Less's congregation in the late 17th century, including from the Martineau and Colombine families. Pastors at this time included John Bruckner and Joseph Nicol Scott.

Its use as a French Protestant Church, or the Walloon Church, continued with services in the French language until 1832, when it was sold to the Swedenborgians, also known as the Church of the New Jerusalem. The Swedenborgians moved to Park Lane in 1852. In 1869 it became a Catholic Apostolic Church; due to their belief in the Second Coming, there was no provision for the continuation of the ministry and when the Norwich leader died in 1953 they gave up the church. After this it was used as a parish hall for St Andrew's parish. It became a Grade I listed building in 1954.

=== 1959–present: Closure ===
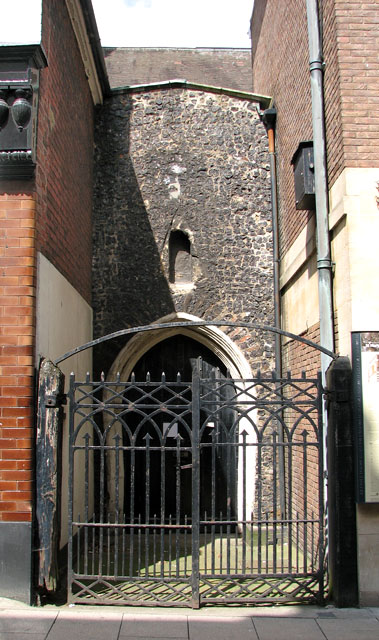
The porch of St Mary the Less, with modern buildings close on both sides

The church was again closed in 1959. It became a furniture warehouse for Robertson & Coleman, a furnishing shop across the street, from 1959 until 1985. The church is now largely surrounded and almost hidden by modern buildings on its east, south and west sides. A part of its former churchyard remains to its north. In July 2008, the church was added to the Historic England Heritage at Risk Register, on which it remains in poor condition and with high vulnerability to slow decay. It remains under private ownership, and its entrance is currently wedged between two estate agents. In 2016, the church was being used as the base of operation for the Norfolk Strangers Association, and a library on the Low Countries was in the chancel. The Norwich French Church Charity has the repair of the French Church in Norwich as its primary aim, though also aims to give grants to children in Norwich for apprenticeships and other assistance, with a preference toward those with French Protestant origin.

== Architecture ==
There is no significant documentation regarding the church's construction. Its present structure dates to the 13th, 14th and 15th centuries, though the plan is more similar to that of a church of the 11th or 12th centuries. There was a recorded lack of church income in the 1420s, possibly due to expenditure on building works on St Mary the Less, and recorded spending on chaplains celebrating in the church in 1431 may be evidence of the completion of this building project. The church consists of a west tower, a nave and chancel, and a south porch. The church has a total length of 22.5 metres (74 ft), similar to that of St Augustine's and St Martin at Palace in the city. It is built of flint with stone, the flint taking up almost the entirety of its visible fabric. There are brick dressings, which are used in the arch-heads, and cut stone, used to a small extent for the windows and doors. All openings of the church are modest two-centred arches. The church roof has three bays, and features arch-braced principals.

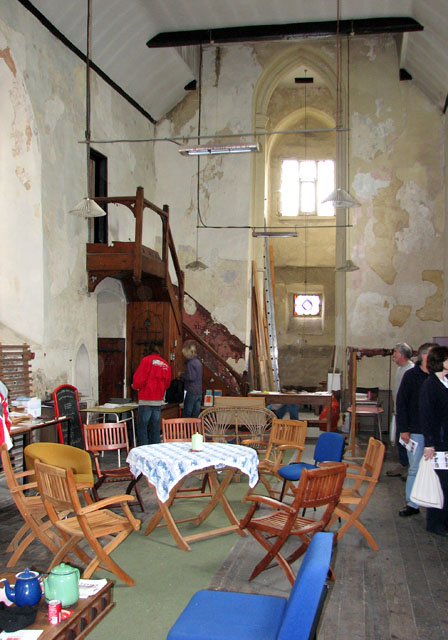
There is a tall, narrow arch from the nave to the tower (2010).

The tower of St Mary the Less has thick walls and thus a small internal width. Though it has diagonal buttresses on its west face, its eastern buttresses are not diagonal as was usual in Norwich; they instead run north-to-south and create a wide, flat wall against the nave. Its parapet is flat. The two-centred window openings to this tower on its top stage are blocked with red brick, which contrasts against the black flint and gives the tower a distinctive appearance. The interior of the tower features a tall, narrow arch into the nave. Here on the west side of the church there is a two-light square window and a door with a fanlight.

The three-bay nave measures about 14.5 metres by 7 metres. Its walls are tall, though are not buttressed and lean outward as a result of this. There are two re-faced 13th century windows with Y-tracery in its north wall, and two three-light windows in its south wall. The interior nave walls clasp toward those of the chancel, though there is no arch here; it may have been removed as there are remains of a respond on the north side.

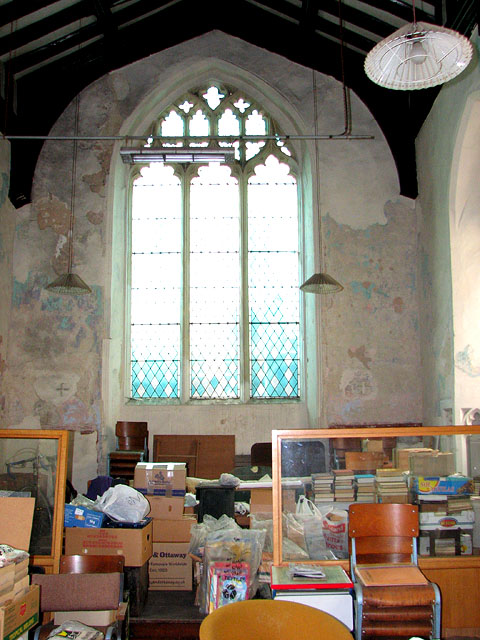
The chancel has a three-light east window (2010)

The two-bay chancel, measuring 8 metres by 5 metres, has the largest window of the church, a three-light east window that features ogee heads that support four batement lights, themselves divided by a transom. It possibly dates to the early 15th century. As well as this there are two-light openings on the chancel's south side; these have heads with upright cusped quatrefoils that may also date from the early 15th century. There is a 19th-century two-light square-headed window also in the chancel.

The Queen Street entrance to the church is small and easy to miss. The year 1637 is inscribed on the entrance doorway which has a semi-circular arch, denoting the date the French Protestants took it over. The south porch is of two storeys, and is accommodated by the height of the nave. It has attached shafts and a two-centre arch, as well as a statue niche above the door which is weathered.

== Furnishings ==
Following the church's acquisition by the city in 1542, the furnishings of the church and churchyard were largely stripped. It is unknown how the Walloon Church or the Swedenborgians furnished the church, though George Plunkett recorded the fixtures that the Catholic Apostolic Church used. These include lamp stands that had existed either side of the altar that now reside by the lectern at St George Tombland.

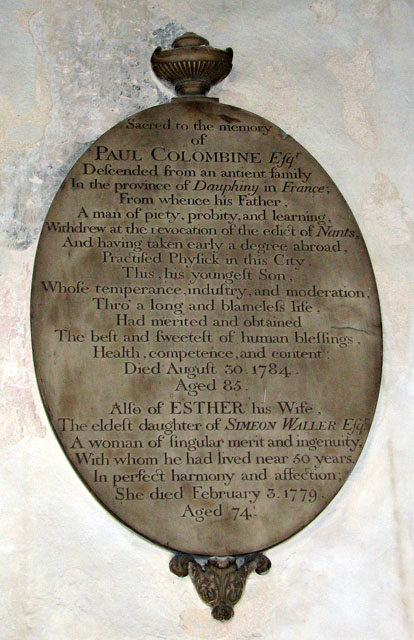
Memorial to Paul Colombine (d. 1784)

After 1542, families were required to pay the city to retain their family memorials in the church. Monument inscriptions to the Martineaus and Colombines, both Walloon Stranger families arriving after 1685, still exist in the church.

== Parish ==
The parish of St Mary the Less was always small, though complex and changing. The southern extent of the parish boundary likely only consisted of three tenements beyond Queen Street, and it may have included parts of Tombland to the east. The Popinjay Inn, in the corner of Tombland may have existed in the parish, as did the east side of Upper King Street. Westward along Queen Street the parish likely occupied two tenements, and then three tenements northward on the west side of Tombland.

Changes to the boundaries included the encroachment of the parish of St Michael at Plea which met the sides of St Mary's tower by the time of the first Ordnance Survey map. It also included the parish's amalgamation with the parish of St Cuthbert, and then St Mary the Less's parish being subsumed into St George Tombland in 1542.
