= St Mary Coslany =

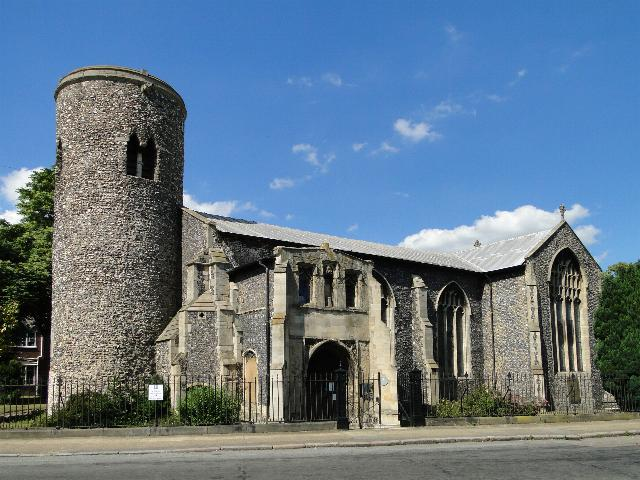
- St Mary Coslany's south entrance in 2010
- St Mary Coslany
- 52.63422°N 1.29144°E
- OS grid reference: TG 22825 09131
- Location: Norwich, Norfolk
- Country: England
- Denomination: Church of England
- Website: manderauctions.co.uk/norwich-saleroom

History
- Status: Parish church
- Founded: by 1175–1186
- Dedication: Mary, mother of Jesus

Architecture
- Functional status: Redundant
- Heritage designation: Grade I listed building
- Designated: 26 February 1954
- Closed: 1971

St Mary Coslany is a Grade I listed round-tower redundant parish church in the city of Norwich, Norfolk in England. In existence under the abbey of St Benet of Holme by 1175–86, the church features architecture from the 11th and 15th centuries, having been rebuilt in 1477. Made redundant in 1971, it has been an auction house for Mander Auctions since 2024.

== Dedication and naming ==
The church is likely dedicated to Mary in title alone, and this dedication was likely later supplemented by a dedication to a Marian feast; either the Assumption or Annunciation. While the spandrels of the church's porch depict the Annunciation, this is common in many churches dedicated otherwise. The central boss in the crossing in front of the church's chancel arch shows the Assumption, possibly indicating a devotion to this event. Coslany was a ward of Norwich.

== History ==
The date of the church's actual origin is unclear, with much of its original material no longer extant. It may have been constructed for the Cheney family of Horsford. The register of the abbey of St Benet of Holme holds the first mention of St Mary Coslany in one of its charters, dateable to 1175–86. It is a grant from the abbey to a Robert de Reepham concerning the land lying against the cemetery of St Mary Coslany, not the church itself. During this time, the advowson for St Mary Coslany was held by the Augustinian Coxford priory, with the earliest evidence of this being a 1207 confirmation charter of Pope Innocent III. It is one of 42 churches that were held by Coxford priory. It is possible that the founder of the priory, William Cheney, already had patronage of St Mary's when he succeeded his brother John as sheriff of Norfolk and Suffolk in 1146.

The church was rebuilt in 1477. During the dissolution of the monasteries, the Coxford priory passed to Thomas Howard, Duke of Norfolk in 1538, and then to Roger Townshend in 1578/9. This led to the Townsend family being licensing curates of St Mary Coslany in the late 17th century.

The church was closed by 1890, and was neglected at this time. It was closed, restored and re-opened several times until its final re-opening in 1905. It was designated a Grade I listed building in 1954.

=== 1971–present: Redundancy ===
It became redundant in 1971 or 1974. Until 1984, it was the headquarters of the Friends of Norwich Churches. In 2000, it was a centre for the sale of antiques. It underwent use as a craft and design centre for several years, then became an internet bookshop and the offices of a publishing company until 2022. Following approval of its conversion to an auction house from Norwich City Council in 2024, it became home to Mander Auctions.

== Location ==
The church is located on the low ridge of the city's Oak Street, similarly to St Martin at Palace and St Michael Coslany. It originally would have overlooked low-lying, marshy ground to its south-west and likely also boggy land around the Muspole to its east. It was overlooked by Tothille (look-out hill) 0.5 kilometres (0.31 mi) to the north, on which once existed an early Saxon cremation cemetery.

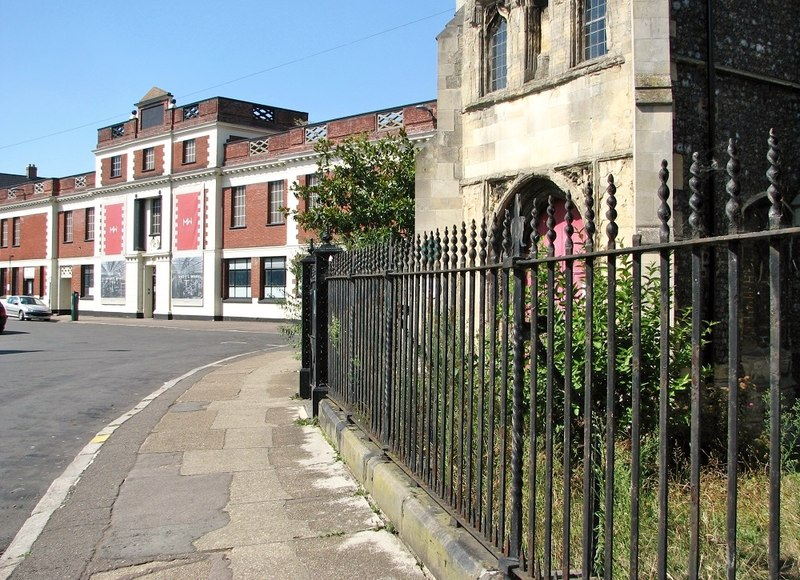
The former factory St Mary's Works is located next to the church

The vicinity in which it now exists is an open area, St Mary's Plain, which is between Oak Street and Pitt Street.

== Architecture ==
Most of the church's architecture is from the 11th and 15th centuries. It is in a cruciform layout, and features a round west tower, a four-bay nave and a chancel, north and south transepts, and a south porch. It is largely made of flint with stone dressing, and has lead roofs.

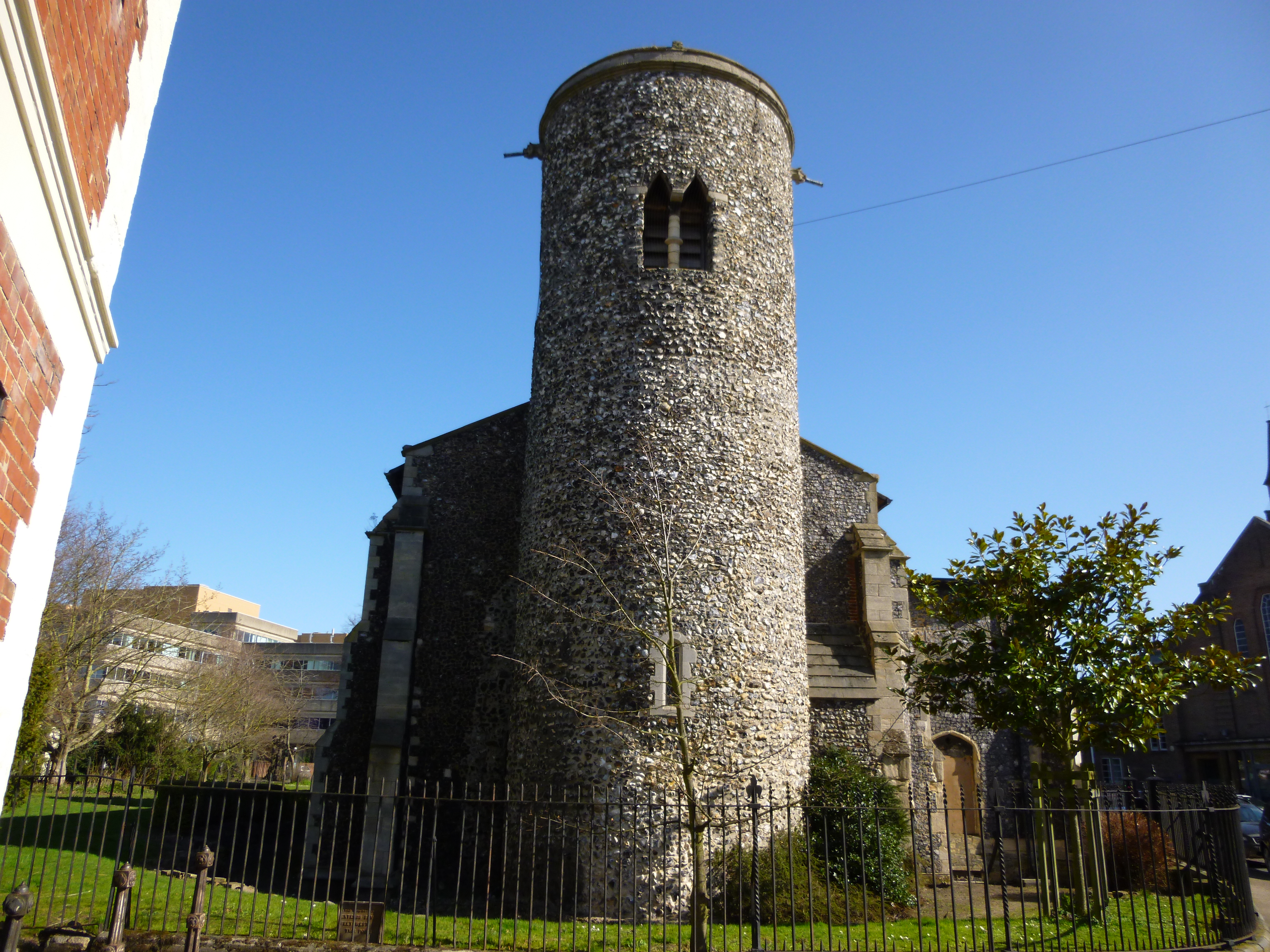
The western round tower has existed since the 12th century, its earliest remaining structure.

The church's round tower, its earliest extant structure from the first half of the 12th century, as well as its most distinct feature and possibly the oldest round tower in the city, has two-light windows with twin triangular arches. These openings were of Caen stone from their first construction, likely imported following the foundation of Norwich Cathedral in the 1090s. A Gothic belfry was added to the tower in the 15th century. The windows were blocked and were rediscovered when the tower was shortened in 1906, removing the belfry.

The church's nave has always been aisleless. The original nave was around 5 to 5.5m in width internally, and it had side walls of about 4.8m in height and a roof pitch at about 50 degrees. The north-west corner of the original nave is ragged, which is possible evidence for cut stone or Caen quoins, removed when the nave was widened to 8 metres (8.7 yd). It is 20.45 metres (22.36 yd) in length. The current west wall of the nave also holds some material from the first half of the 12th century. There was an altar to the Holy Trinity in the church as of the 13th century, likely in the nave. Around 1300 to 1350, there was a likely building campaign undertaken on the nave. Following this, the nave windows were enlarged and this work included raising the height of the walls and buttresses in this area. The present nave has two three-light Perpendicular-style windows with two centre arches on the south side. The heads on these windows, however, are centred for two-light windows as they have four batement lights each. This pattern was in use in Norwich up to 60 years prior, in the chancel of St Helen's from the 1380s.

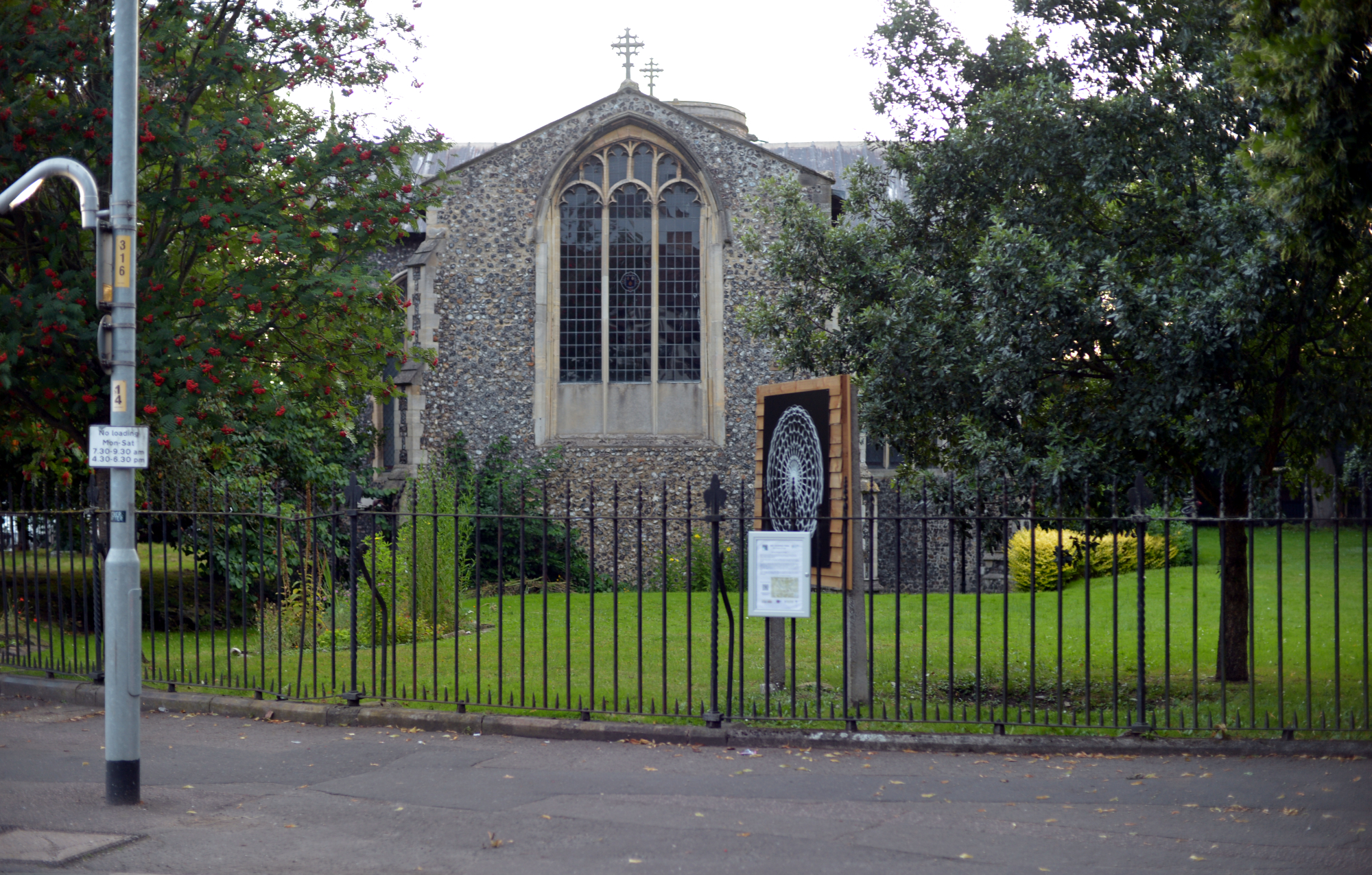
The eastern end of the chancel with its three-light Perpendicular window

A now-blocked window in the eastern bay of the north chancel wall, the only remaining Decorated window in the church, possibly indicates that while initially shorter, the chancel was at its present length by the 14th century. It is now at 11.14 metres (12.18 yd) long and 6 metres (6.6 yd) wide, the longest in Norwich north of the River Wensum. The 1300–50 work on the nave possibly also included the chancel, and there was substantial rebuilding while retaining the same dimensions in the 15th century prior to 1466 which included the addition of one new window on the north side and two on the south side. In 1466, one Alice Wyrthe bequeathed money to lead the roof of the vestry. It has a three-light Perpendicular east window, formerly of Decorated style, which does not fit its arch or embrasures, having possibly been salvaged from another church. The chancel roof, likely dating to 1460, has ceiling panels which involve carved heads, angels and foliage in their cusping. It was restored in the 20th century, involving the carving of new pieces to repair damage. The chancel arch is supported on corbels.

The south porch of the church, is estimated by Brian Ayers et al to have been built around the 1450s though possibly as early as the 1430s, though Nicholas Groves states it is from 1466. Either way, it was constructed after the church's nave reached its present form. It is two storeys and features re-faced diagonal buttresses. It features a large amount of cut stone on its façade, and includes an elaborate niche which likely had a statue of Mary. Either side of the entrance arch, carved spandrels display a representation of the Annunciation with Mary on the left and the angel Gabriel on the right which is the opposite of the usual arrangement of these figures. The porch plinth has some remains of flushwork of the 'Maria' cipher in carved pale limestone set with dark knapped flints, though these have mainly fallen out. The interior of the south porch has a tierceron vault inside.

Both the north and south transept arms of the church were most likely built at the same time as part of a unified architectural project, likely led by a singular mason. They measure 14.52 metres (15.88 yd) total, equal to the length of the nave divided by the square root of 2, and are covered by one roof which cuts through the nave roof; an attempt was made to integrate the carpentry. These single-bay transepts have curved wall bracing and tall four-light Perpendicular windows on their ends, as well as three-light east windows with staggered brattished transoms. The west wall of the southern transept arm is positioned on top of a nave buttress. The windows in the transepts are large; the north and south windows feature 22 tracery lights each, and the east transept windows have 12 each. In the window of the northern transept there are the initials 'IW', possibly in commemoration of leading Norwich glazier and Fybridge alderman John Harrow (alias Wighton) who gave £10 for the church fabric in 1457. This potentially dates the creation of the transepts. The transept roof has a central boss in front of the chancel arch which displays Mary being assumed to heaven in an aureole. Four further bosses on the diagonal arch braces each depict an angel in different costumes. There are rood stairs in north-east corner of the transept and chancel.

Little stained glass remains in the church; in the church's 1552 Return of Church Goods, a payment of £20 is logged for the "new glassing of the XVII windows", which it said contained "the lyves of certain prophane histories, and other olde windows".

== Furnishings ==
The interior of the church in the medieval era had a rood screen across its chancel arch, likely also with screens across its transepts. These were all removed in the 16th century, alongside images that stood in the niches along the nave walls.

In the 1460s, a new chapel was built in the south transept, the Lady Chapel. Here, there is evidence that there was a pietà by the 1460s, which was accompanied by images of Mary Magdalene and Saint Anne. In the northern transept is St Thomas's chapel which includes imagery of John the Baptist. The chapels were removed in the 16th century.

The church had a pair of organs, listed in its post-Reformation returns, which were sold for 66s 8d. Parts of the organ from St Mary Coslany are now in the organ at St Augustine's. There was also a font from the second half of the 15th century which in 1978 was relocated to the Holy Trinity church in Bramley, Surrey and remains there as of 2026. It has shields set within cusped octofoil panels, and its stem has a two-light tracery design on each of its eight sides, beneath which is a quatrefoil that resembles a four leaf clover. A 14th-century chest from St Mary Coslany, painted in watercolour by Henry Ninham in 1863, is held by the Norfolk Museums Service (NMS). There was a brass of John and Cecily Herne featuring John wearing a short sword; this was recorded by Thomas Talbot in the early 19th century. Only the head of the John figure has survived, also with the NMS.

In 1911, six stalls with misericords were recorded in the church by J. C. Cox, who stated that on one side from the east there were two misericords with uncharged shields, and another with a "Mitred head" with supporters, and on the other there was one with a depiction of "a woman's head in wimple and gorget, at the base of plain vaulting", another with "a small head with curled hair, at the base of plain vaulting", and a third similar to the second but with a flat cap. He wrote that "all supporters are in formal leaf in roundels, except where stated." The stalls were photographed in 1968 and were moved to Horsham St Faith in 1978.

=== Burials and memorials ===
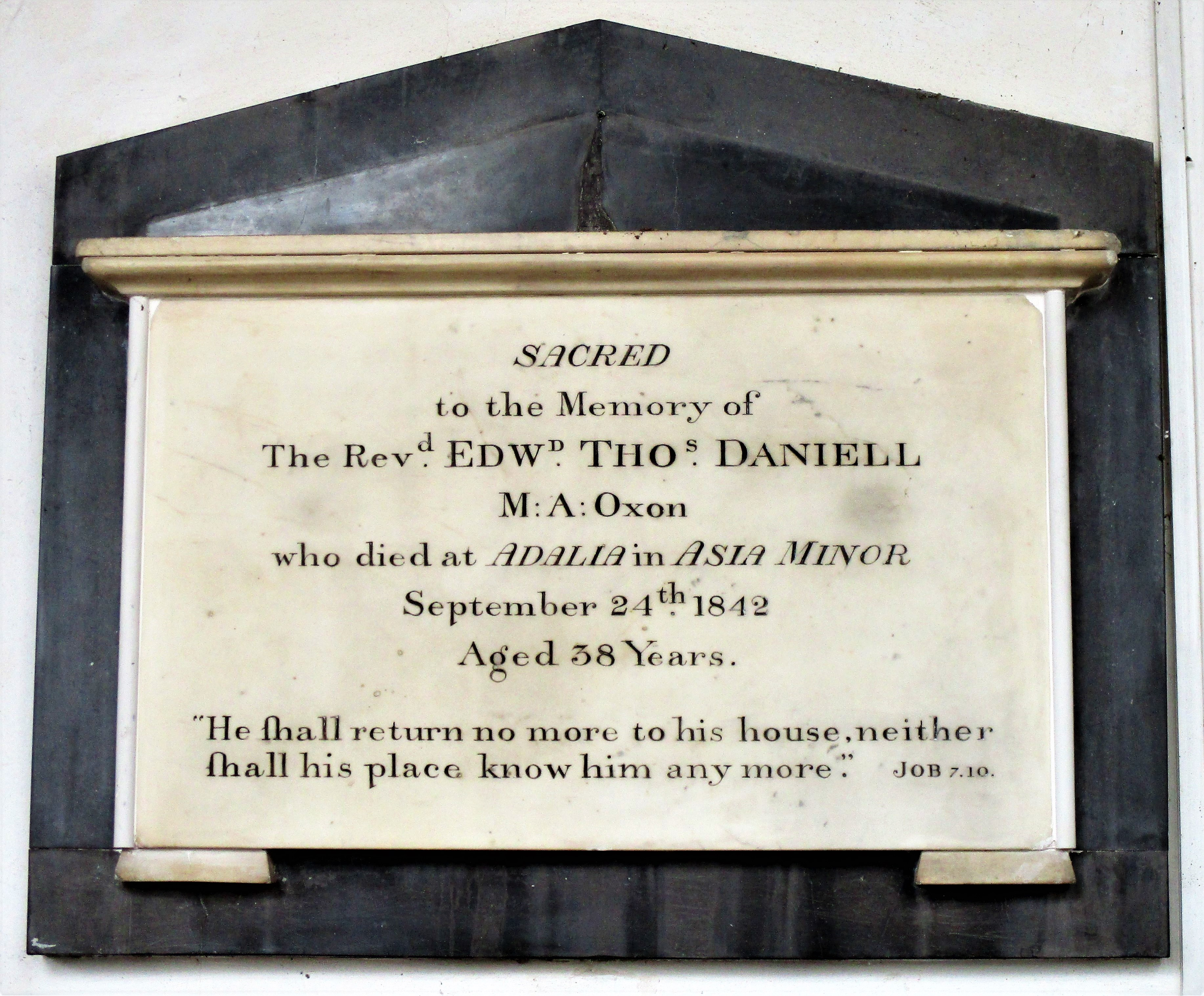
A memorial plaque to Reverend Edward Thomas Daniell in the church

There is a monument to Peter de Lingcole on the nave's north wall in Norman French, dated 1298. It records Lingcole's bequest to the altar of the church of the Holy Trinity which was located nearby. An 1830 watercolour of the church depicts an incised slab in a wall tomb to Martin van Kurnbeck (d. 1578); this appears to have featured painted figures of the commemorated kneeling in prayer, which are now largely lost. Below these are surviving incised figures, themselves kneeling to the sides of a desk covered with a cloth, on which rests open prayer book. There remains a memorial to Thomas of Lincoln; he was buried by the church's altar of the Holy Trinity in the late 13th century. Two people requested burial at St Mary's porch; the aforementioned John Wighton in 1457, and Johanna Halle in 1466. Parishioner, glazier and member of Wighton's workshop Helen Mountford, as well as her Dutch husband William who was also a glazier, were buried at the church in 1458 and 1478 respectively. In 1464, Gregory Draper left the church 26s 8d to improve the cross-aisle, and he requested his burial in the south transept chapel, and Robert Wood did the same, though gave 20s. A Henry Toke left £6 13s 4d to furnish the northern St Thomas's chapel, as well as candles to burn at the Easter Sepulchre, and was buried there in 1466. Martin Vankurnbecke, a wealthy immigrant self-described as a "Doctor in Arte and Physicke of the city of Norwich" was buried at the church after his death in February 1578/9.

== Archaeology ==
There was restoration work done on the church in c. 1908 included the digging of a trench north to south across the nave, which found no evidence of the early foundations of the nave wall, likely removed for reuse elsewhere. In 1985, there was an archaeological excavation at the west end of church just to the north of the tower. Substantial flint footings were recovered.

== Parish ==
=== Boundaries ===
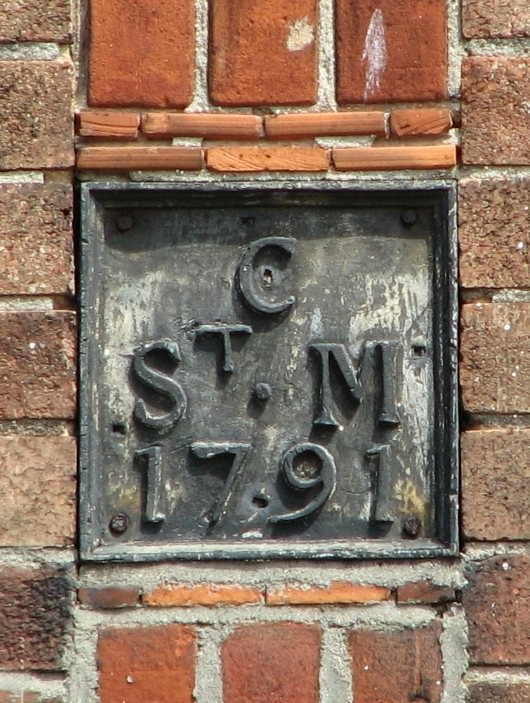
A 1791 parish boundary marker of St Mary Coslany located on Oak Street

The parish of St Mary Coslany was once bordered by five others which were St Martin at Oak, St Michael Coslany, likely St George Colegate, St Olaf, and a detached part of St Clement Colegate's parish. St Olaf's parish was absorbed into St George Colegate's in the 16th century. The northern border was largely marked by St Martin's Lane, except for its western end where it went south around St Martin's churchyard and then crossed Oak Street over to the River Wensum. It included the north bank side of the 15th century New Mills, and the boundary then ran along the river on its west side. At an island in the river, the boundary began eastward, crossing back over Oak Street and over Rosemary Lane then moving north across what is now Muspole Street and returning toward St Martin's Lane. On the south and east boundaries there are several right-angled changes in direction, likely the result of property interests in adjacent parishes.

=== Parishioners ===
By around 1300, the parish was relatively populous. Glazier John Wighton was a resident in the parish, and his workshop remained active in the parish for multiple decades following his death. Parishioner Helen Mountford was a glazier and member of Wighton's workshop. Baptist preacher Samuel Fisher had a house in the parish where he was holding his meetings by November 1774. Luke Hansard, the first publisher of the House of Commons Journal, was born in the parish and baptised at St Mary's.

In 1901, the parish had an elderly population, a gross death rate of 5.8 per 1000 people, and an average population density of 100 people per acre, far higher than the average of 15.5 per acre across Norwich.
