= St Benedict's Church, Norwich =

St Benedict's Church
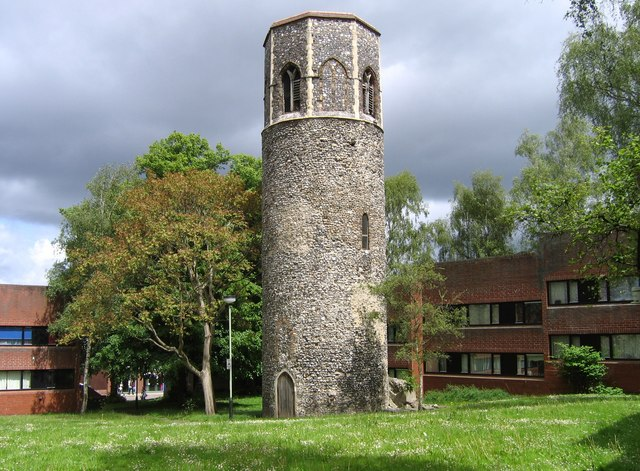
- St Benedict's church tower in 2006
- St Benedict's Church
- 52°37′52″N 1°17′10″E
- OS grid reference: TG 22479 08777
- Location: Norwich, Norfolk
- Country: England
- Denomination: Church of England

History
- Dedication: St Benedict

Architecture
- Heritage designation: Grade I listed
- Closed: 1942

St Benedict's Church is a Grade I listed Anglican former parish church in Norwich, Norfolk, England. The round-tower church is medieval and probably dates from the 11th century, undergoing a series of phases of construction and refurbishment. It was badly damaged in an air raid in 1942 and the only part still standing is the round tower. It is dedicated to Saint Benedict.

== History ==
The church was the most westerly of the five medieval churches along St Benedict's Street, and stood just within the city walls. The patronage of the church belonged to the priory of Buckenham until the dissolution of the monasteries. It was later purchased from the Crown by the parishioners. The parishioners held the advowson and appointed clergy by preaching contest, in a similar manner to the parishes of St Peter Mancroft and St Andrew.

The sequence of building on site from the 11th century to the 16th century was revealed by excavations in 1972. The earliest structure on the site was an 11th-century nave with an apsidal east end. This was later extended eastwards with a square-ended chancel in the Early English style. The date of the round tower is obscure; as it appears now it seems to date from later than the nave, but it may still have been first built during the Norman period.

The tower was refaced and increased in height in the 14th century, adding an octagonal belfry. In the 15th century, the whole church was later rebuilt in the perpendicular style, except for the tower. A clerestoried nave with a north aisle in particular was built circa 1484. A font was created for the church in the 15th century.

As it stood in the early 19th century, the body of the church consisted of a clerestoried nave and chancel, with an aisle on the north side only, the latest part of the building. Philip Browne, writing in 1814, said that despite its ancient foundation "the present building has a modern appearance", adding that "the inside is very neat, but has no monumental inscriptions. The communion plate is all of silver, and is modern and elegant. Instead of a communion table, the East end is fitted up with a real altar."

Further restorations and alterations followed until the end of the 19th century. By 1860 the church was considered so dilapidated that there was serious consideration for demolishing it and building a new church, though it instead received a restoration the same year, including a rebuilding of the east wall, a new east window, and a replacement of the lead roof with slates. The church contained an organ dating from 1860 by Ward. Restorations also included the reconstruction of the north aisle arcade with cast iron columns in 1896. This replaced two of the church's three arcade piers with these columns in order to improve sight lines for those sitting in the aisle. Another restoration took place in 1899. The appearance of the church in the 1930s is recorded in a series of photographs taken by George Plunkett.

=== Destruction ===
The body of the church was largely destroyed in an air raid in January 1942, gutting it. Much of the furnishings dating from the 1899 refitting were destroyed. The walls of the church largely survived, damaged, but were demolished in the 1950s. All that now survives of St Benedict's is the tower, surrounded by a residential development built in 1976.

The system of compensation after the war meant that the Diocese of Norwich was paid war reparation money for St Benedict's, so long as it was spent on rebuilding. But that did not have to be on the same spot, and the Church of England claimed for a new St Benedict's, which was put in the middle of the Gunton housing estate in Lowestoft, Suffolk. The bell from the Norwich church tower was rehung in the new church, while the font from the old St Benedict's is now in St Mary's Church, Erpingham.
