= National Centre for Writing =

Literature development agency based in Norwich, England

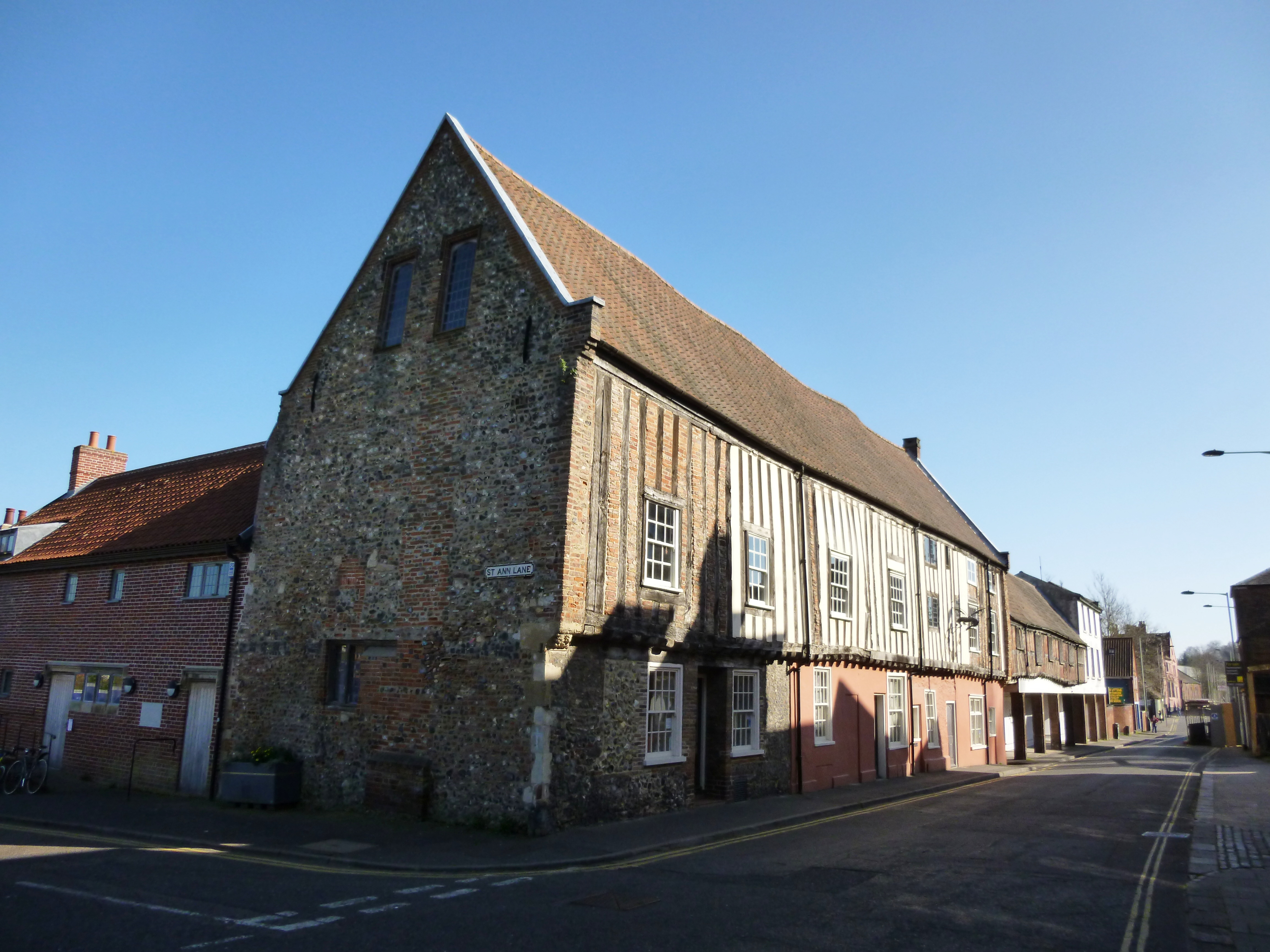
Dragon Hall, Norwich

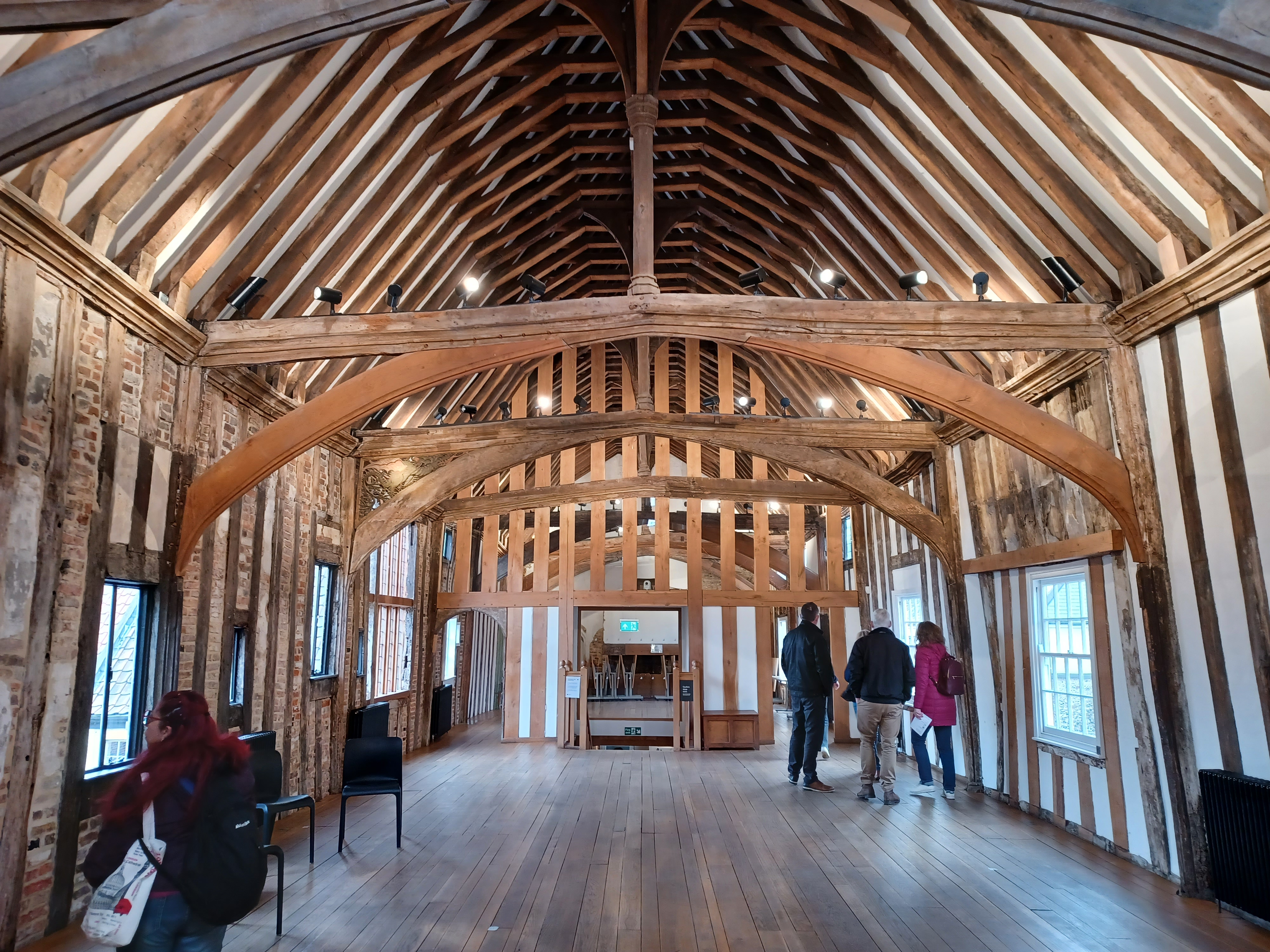
The Great Hall, internal.

The National Centre for Writing, formerly Writers' Centre Norwich, is a literature development agency and national centre for writing based in Norwich, England. It led the successful bid for Norwich to be granted the UNESCO City of Literature title in 2012.

In April 2015, the organisation moved into the historic building Dragon Hall, Norwich.
