= John Bruckner =

Dutch Lutheran minister and author

John Bruckner (also Jean or Johannes) (31 December 1726 – 12 May 1804) was a Dutch Lutheran minister and author, who settled in Norwich, England.

== Life ==
He was born on the Land van Cadzand (locally Kezand), then a small island in Zeeland. He was educated for the ministry, mainly at the University of Franeker, where he studied Greek under Lodewijk Caspar Valckenaer; and held a charge at Leyden.

In 1752 an elder of the Norwich Walloon church that leased the Church of St Mary the Less, seeking a successor to Michel Olivier Vallotton as pastor, recruited Bruckner, who could preach in Latin, Dutch, French, and English; and he came in Norwich in 1753. In addition to his duties at St Mary the Less, he succeeded Dr. van Sarn, about 1766, as pastor of the Norwich Dutch church who used the choir of the church of St John the Baptist. These duties were light, and lessened. Bruckner held the joint charge till his death, and was the last regular minister of either church.

He taught French, Amelia Opie being among his pupils, and acted as organist. He also took part in the Norwich literary circle.

He committed suicide at Norwich, while suffering from depression, on Saturday, 12 May 1804. He was buried at Guist, near Foulsham, Norfolk. He had married in 1782 Miss Cooper of Guist, a former pupil, who predeceased him. John Opie painted his portrait, which was exhibited at the Royal Academy in 1800; one of Amelia Opie's ‘Lays’ is about this portrait.

== Works ==
Bruckner wrote Théorie du Système Animal, Leyden, 1767 (anon.), a work now referenced in terms of the history of ecology; it commented on animal populations, from the attitude of natural theology. In chapters VII and X there is an anticipation of Thomas Malthus's views, and Loren Eiseley took Bruckner as the immediate forerunner of Malthus. This work was translated within two years into English by Thomas Cogan; and into German by Christian Garve. Bruckner's ideas were taken from Montesquieu and Buffon, as well as general reading; they were noticed by Karl Marx as the beginnings of modern "population theory". Bruckner is also noted as an early proponent of the food web concept.

Other works were:

- ‘Criticisms on the Diversions of Purley. By John Cassander,’ 1790. John Horne Tooke replied in his edition of 1798. Bruckner's views derived from Albert Schultens and Tiberius Hemsterhuis. Richard Taylor included information on Bruckner in his 1829 edition of the Diversions.
- ‘Thoughts on Public Worship,’ 1792; in reply to Gilbert Wakefield's ‘Enquiry into the Expediency and Propriety of Public or Social Worship,’ 1791. In his preface Bruckner promises a continuation.

He began a didactic poem in French verse, intended to popularise the views of his ‘Théorie.’ Lines on his own wrinkled and ‘lugubre’ countenance are in Amelia Opie's ‘Life.’
