= Music House =

House in Norwich, England

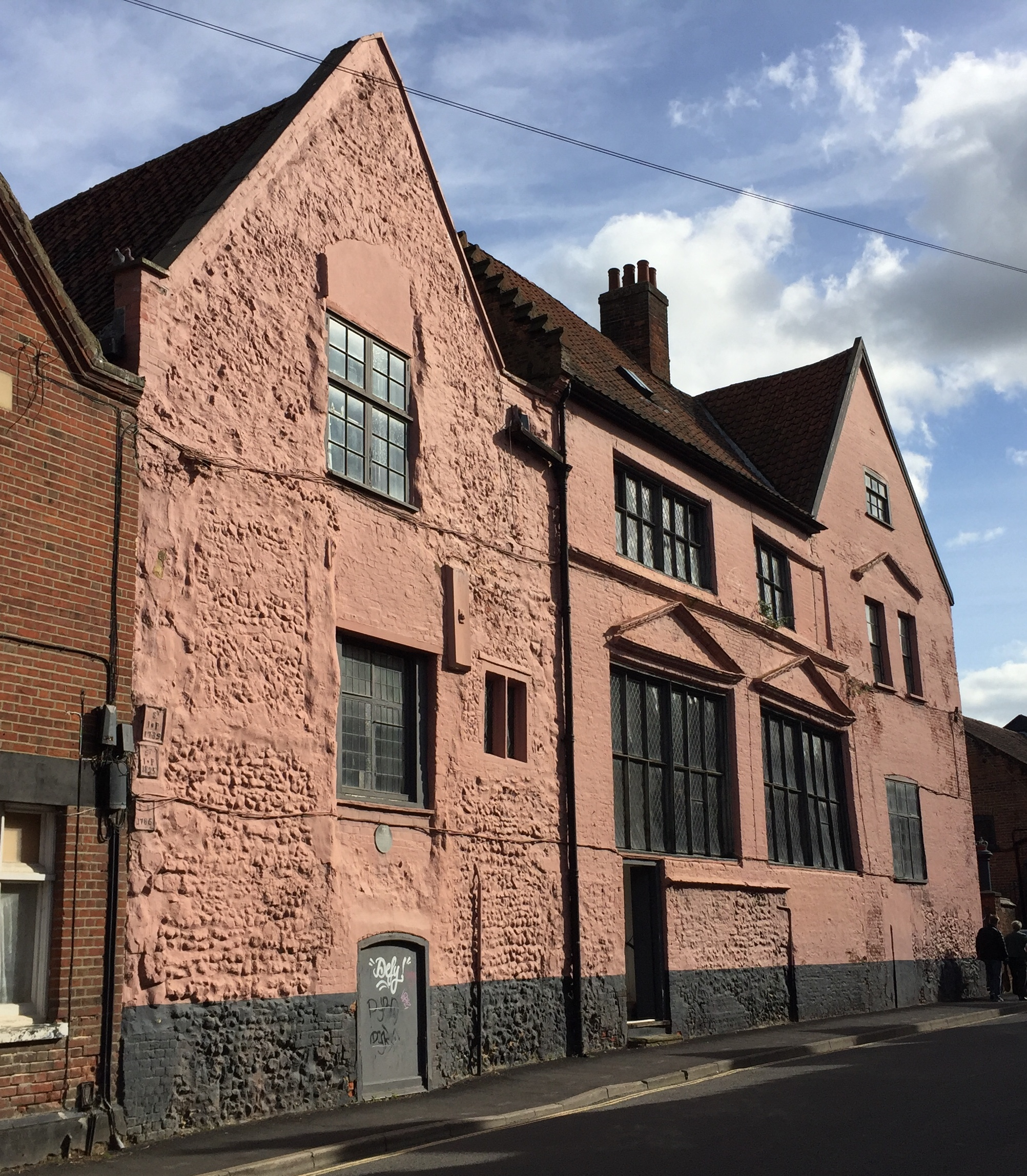

General information
- Location: 167 and 169 King Street, Norwich, United Kingdom
- Coordinates: 52.62405°N 1.30257°E
- Grid position: TG 23628 08041

Design and construction
- Designations

Listed Building – Grade I
- Designated: 26 February 1954
- Reference no.: 1217907

Music House, more recently known as Wensum Lodge and Jurnet's House, is a Grade I listed building in the city of Norwich in Norfolk, England. Located at 167 and 169 King Street, it saw construction from the 12th century onward. Its north range is noted for being the oldest domestic structure in Norwich, its last standing secular Norman building. As of 2026, it is on Historic England's Heritage at Risk Register.

== History ==
Music House saw construction from the 12th century, with its earliest parts dating to circa 1140–50, when it was likely first constructed. It was likely extended in circa 1175. Its north range is the final remaining secular Norman building in Norwich, and also the oldest surviving domestic structure in the city. Between the 12th and 16th centuries, King Street, on which it is located, became a centre for Norwich's commercial activity, particularly through the private quays and two public staithes along the street. During its medieval period, Chris King has suggested that the undercroft was for commercial use, with the first floor operating as accommodation.

Vivian D. Lipman incorrectly stated in 1967 that the house was under ownership of one Jurnet, and may have been built by him, before he passed the house to his son Isaac. While this was believed for a significant period, it is now believed that Jurnet, Isaac's father, never owned the building, instead owning an adjoining tenement. Brian Ayers, however, states that the house was in Jewish ownership by the third quarter of the 12th century; the Jurnet family was Jewish. Isaac can be confirmed to have owned Music House by 1225, when he acquired a license from the king that would extend the quay by the house. A messuage had previously belonged to John Curry, and was granted by the king in 1253. In 1260, the purchase of this messuage was referenced as a purchase by Isaac from one John, son of Herbert. Music House is thus the only remaining medieval structure in Norwich that definitely belonged to a Jewish family. Isaac was a well-known financier; in the 1220s, he had £1,647 in transactions that had been recorded in the Norwich Day Book, with the next highest individual having £258.

From the early modern period, the King Street area declined in status. From the 15th century, the building became a large merchant's property, which faced the quayside. By this date, the building may not have been residential, and was more likely solely used for the storage and display of merchandise like Dragon Hall nearby. From the early 17th century, the building's domestic use was restored when the Paston family moved in.

The undercroft of Music House in 2018, in use as Jurnet's Bar

In the first part of the 20th century, the house became known as the Music House. It became a Grade I listed building in 1954. The north range of the building became known as Wensum Lodge; for 40 years prior to 2023, the building complex was used as an adult education centre, teaching maths and English as well as silversmithing and pottery. Also for almost 40 years prior to the 2020 COVID-19 pandemic, the undercroft of Music House was used as Jurnet's Bar. After closure due to pandemic lockdowns, the entire building was found to have taken on damp and mould. This made the venue unsuitable for the bar to continue, and in 2022 Jurnet's Bar was forced to close permanently.

In 2023, when Norfolk County Council announced plans to sell the site, plans were being created for the building to house a Jewish heritage centre in the city named Jurnet's House, which would cover Norwich's role in the foundation of the antisemitic blood libel trope and an antisemitic massacre in 1190. In 2024, the house was added to Historic England's Heritage at Risk Register, with Norwich City Council enacting urgent repair work the same year. In 2026, the University of East Anglia's goal to set up a Centre for Jewish History was raised in Parliament on Holocaust Memorial Day by MP Peter Prinsley, with mention of plans for its programmes to be based at the house. Music House remains on the register as of 2026, in a poor condition with high vulnerability.

== Architecture ==
The building is made of flint and brick, and features pantile roofs. While the facade of the building on King Street is two-storey, its gable ends reach up to three stories. This brick frontage, featuring moulded brick pediments, was added in the 17th century. Here, there is a 20th-century door which is set into a 12th-century opening which is central to the gable-end on the left, and another door to its right which is from the 20th century. On the second floor, it has five windows that are irregularly spaced. Above, there are two large six-light mullion and transom windows that feature pediments, and above these there is a second set of two similar windows, though they are smaller and the right window is partially blocked. Between these central windows, there is a moulded string course. There are multiple sash and casement windows elsewhere on the frontage.

The ground floor of the house is a vaulted undercroft, which is made of stone and positioned under the gable on the left side of the building, representing the plan of the original house. This undercroft is split into a larger room at the west end, which has roll-moulded and hollow chamfered ribs made of caen stone, and has its entrance from the street. There is then a smaller eastern room which is barrel-vaulted, with two bays of groin vaulting which are situated between flat-section transverse arches. The whole floor has round-headed windows on the south side, and in the south-east corner there are the remains of a newel stair. In the north-east corner, there are the remains of a spiral staircase. Against the undercroft's south side, there is an engaged pier which is dated to circa 1175–80, and is similar to the piers of the Norwich Cathedral infirmary which also date to c. 1180. The pier was originally thought to be part of an entrance to an external stair porch, but was reinterpreted as a pier of a single-aisled stone hall which was part of the southern two-storey range. This was replaced in the 15th century with a brick-vaulted three-bay undercroft.

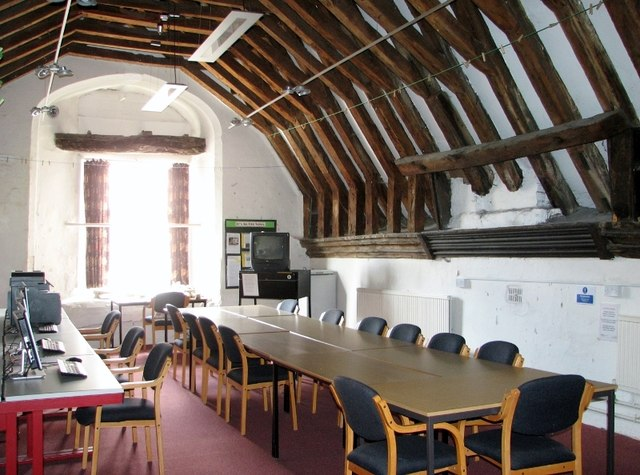
The interior of a room on the first floor of Music House

The first floor features a large chamber above the 12th-century undercroft. In its west gable, there is the base of a large window. There is a scissor braced roof which dates to the 14th or early 15th century.

Music House Lane leads to the house; it was formerly known as Skeydegate in the 13th century.
