= Hickling Priory =

Priory in Norfolk, England

Coordinates: 52.7669°N 1.5830°E

Hickling Priory was an Augustinian priory located in Norfolk, England.

The house was founded in 1185 by Theobald, grandson of Theobald de Valognes, Lord of Parham. By 1291 the Priory had possession of thirty two Norfolk parishes and held an annual three-day All Hallows fair at Hacheston in Suffolk, close to the founders' estate at Parham.

The Plague killed all but two of its brethren and the house never fully recovered, being cited repeatedly thereafter by episcopal authorities for deteriorated buildings and lax observance by the canons.

The Visitations by the Bishops of Norwich shed some light on the Priory's last years.

The Priory acknowledged the king's supremacy on 4 June 1534. The Valor of 1535 gave its value as £100 with their most valuable possession being the nearby manor of Hickling. The house was dissolved in 1536.

Today ruined portions of the church and claustral buildings survive on the privately owned Priory Farm in Hickling.

== See also ==
- List of monastic houses in Norfolk
- List of monastic houses in England
