= St Laurence's Church, Norwich =

Coordinates: 52.6311°N 1.2901°E

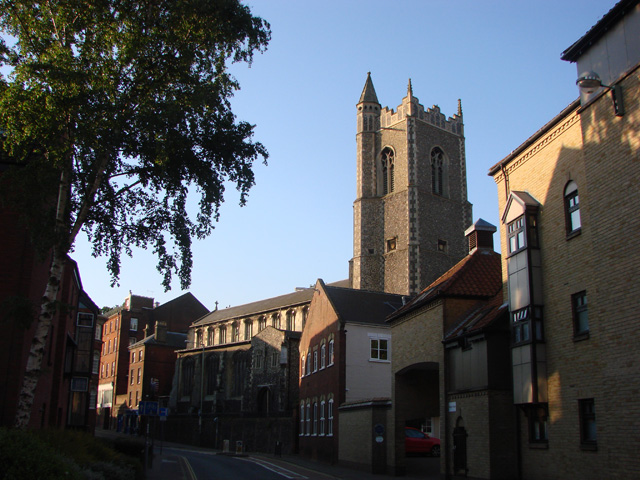
- St Laurence's Church, Norwich

- Location in Norfolk
- OS grid reference: TG 227 088
- Location: St Benedict's Street, Norwich, Norfolk
- Country: England
- Denomination: Anglican
- Website: Churches Conservation Trust

History
- Dedication: Saint Lawrence

Architecture
- Functional status: Redundant
- Heritage designation: Grade I
- Designated: 26 February 1954
- Architectural type: Church
- Style: Perpendicular Gothic

Specifications
- Materials: Flint with stone and brick dressings

St Laurence's Church, or St Lawrence's Church, is a redundant Anglican church in St Benedict's Street, Norwich, Norfolk, England. It is recorded in the National Heritage List for England as a designated Grade I listed building, and is under the care of the Churches Conservation Trust. It stands on a sloping site between Westwick Street and St Benedict's Street.

== History ==
The church was built between 1460 and 1472. It was restored in 1893, during which a corner turret was added to the tower. Towards the end of the 19th century the size of the congregation declined, and in 1903 its parish was united with that of St Gregory's. The church finally closed in 1968 and was later vested in the Churches Conservation Trust. From 1811 to 1827, Edward Glover was curate here. His daughter, Sarah, invented the Norwich sol-fa method of singing which was later modified by John Curwen to form a tonic sol-fa. She then later died in 1867 and was buried in Great Malvern.

== Architecture ==
=== Exterior ===
St Laurence's Church is constructed in flint with stone and brick dressings. The clerestory has an ashlar facing. The roofs are in lead and slate. Its plan consists of a nave and chancel in one unit, north and south aisles, north and south porches, a rood stair turret on the south side, and a west tower. The tower is 112 feet (34 m) high. It is in three stages with diagonal buttresses. In the lowest stage is an arched west door. Its spandrels contain carvings of "St Edmund being arrowed and St Lawrence being grilled". Above the doorway is a four-light Perpendicular window, with niches for statues on each side. In the middle stage are square sound holes, and there is a clock face on the south side. The top stage contains two-light bell openings on each side. The parapet consists of a two-stepped battlements with corner pinnacles. The stair turret terminates in a spirelet.

The aisles have five bays along the nave with an extra half bay extending along the chancel. The windows along the sides of the aisles, and at their ends, are Perpendicular in style with four lights. The clerestory runs along the entire length of the nave and chancel and contains eleven tall three-light windows on each side. The east window of the chancel dates from the late 19th century and is in Perpendicular style. Both porches have two storeys. The north porch has a central statue niche in the upper storey with flanking windows and blocked east and west windows. Inside the porch is a lierne vault.

=== Interior ===
Inside the church, the arcades are carried on octagonal piers. The roof is a hammerbeam supported on corbels carved with angels. At the east end of the church are seven steps leading up to the altar. The reredos is a war memorial of 1921 that includes panels painted by Kingston Rudd. Flanking this are more panels painted with images of angels and saints. There are similar painted panels on the screen to the north aisle chapel. Most of the furniture has been removed from the church, but a 15th-century font is still present. Some medieval stained glass has been incorporated in a mosaic in the east window of the south aisle. Some brasses remain in the church, while others have been removed and are in storage. One of those remaining, on the east wall of the north aisle, is to Sarah Glover, the inventor of the Norwich sol-fa system of musical notation. There is a ring of six bells. The oldest of these was cast in about 1356 by William Revel, the next in about 1530 by William Barker, and the third oldest in 1615 by William Brend. Of the final three, one was cast in 1701 by Charles Newman, and the other two in 1737 by Thomas Newman.

== See also ==
- List of churches preserved by the Churches Conservation Trust in the East of England
