= St Helen's Church, Norwich =

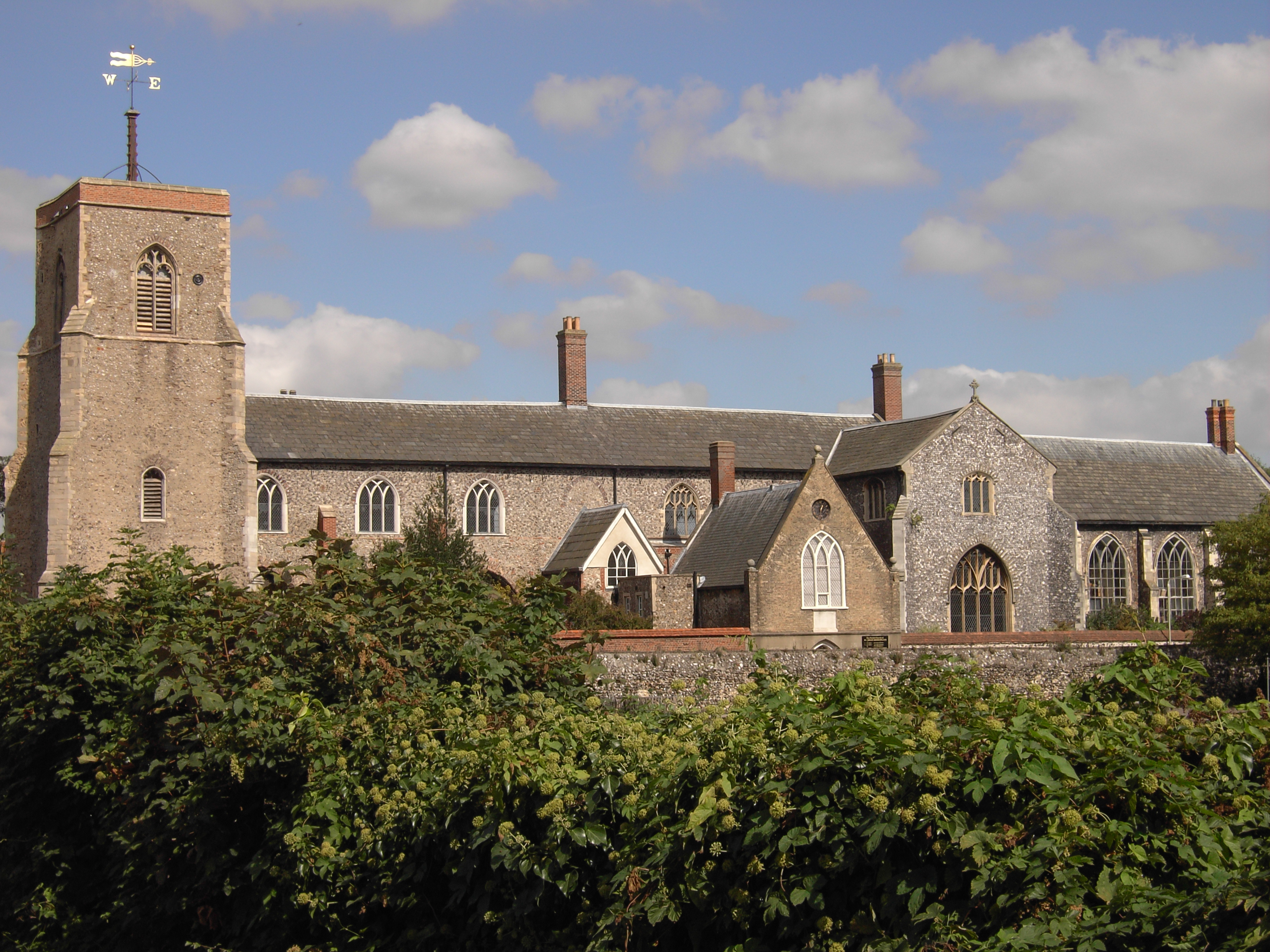
- St Helen's Church, Norwich
- St Helen's Church, Norwich
- 52°37′58.03″N 1°18′17.2″E
- OS grid reference: TG 23733 09020
- Location: Norwich, Norfolk
- Country: England
- Denomination: Church of England
- Website: sainthelenschurch.co.uk

History
- Dedication: St Helen

Architecture
- Heritage designation: Grade I listed

Administration
- Province: Province of Canterbury
- Diocese: Anglican Diocese of Norwich
- Archdeaconry: Norwich
- Deanery: Norwich East
- Parish: St Helen's Norwich

St Helen's Church is a Grade I listed parish church in the Church of England in Norwich.

== History ==
The church was medieval and in 1270 given to the Great Hospital which had been founded in 1249. The original building was demolished and the current tower was built in 1375; the chancel was rebuilt by Henry le Despenser in 1383; nave and aisles of 3 bays and the south transept were all rebuilt ca. 1480 by Bishop James Goldwell.

== Organ ==
The church contains an organ by Mark Noble. A specification of the organ can be found on the National Pipe Organ Register.
