= St George Tombland =

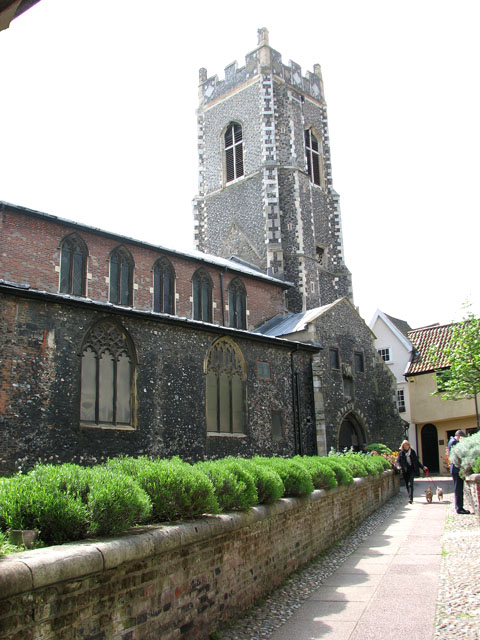
- St George Tombland in 2010
- St George Tombland
- 52°37′51.56″N 1°17′53.67″E
- OS grid reference: TG 23310 08835
- Location: Norwich, Norfolk
- Country: England
- Denomination: Church of England

History
- Dedication: St George

Architecture
- Heritage designation: Grade I listed

Administration
- Province: Province of Canterbury
- Diocese: Anglican Diocese of Norwich
- Archdeaconry: Norwich
- Deanery: Norwich East
- Parish: St George Tombland

St George Tombland is a Grade I listed parish church in Norwich.

== History ==
The church is medieval dating from the 15th century. Legacies were left for the building of the tower in 1445.

== Organ ==
The church contained an organ which dated from 1865 by A and SJ Godball. A specification of the organ can be found on the National Pipe Organ Register.

== Gallery ==
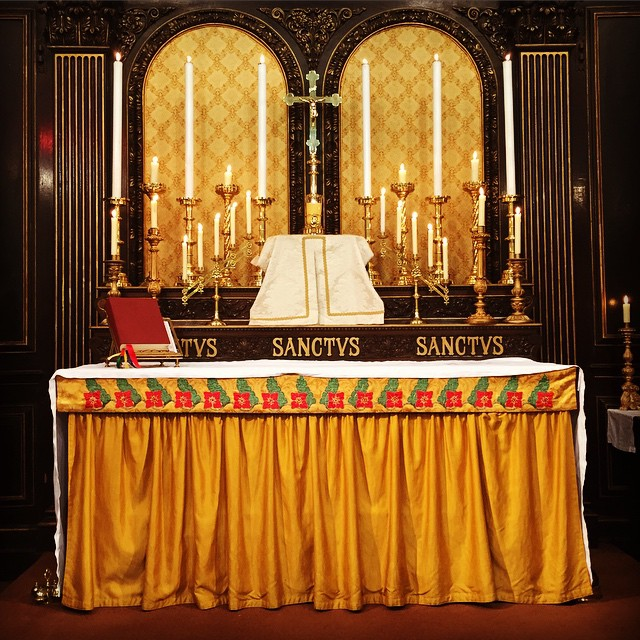
Altar

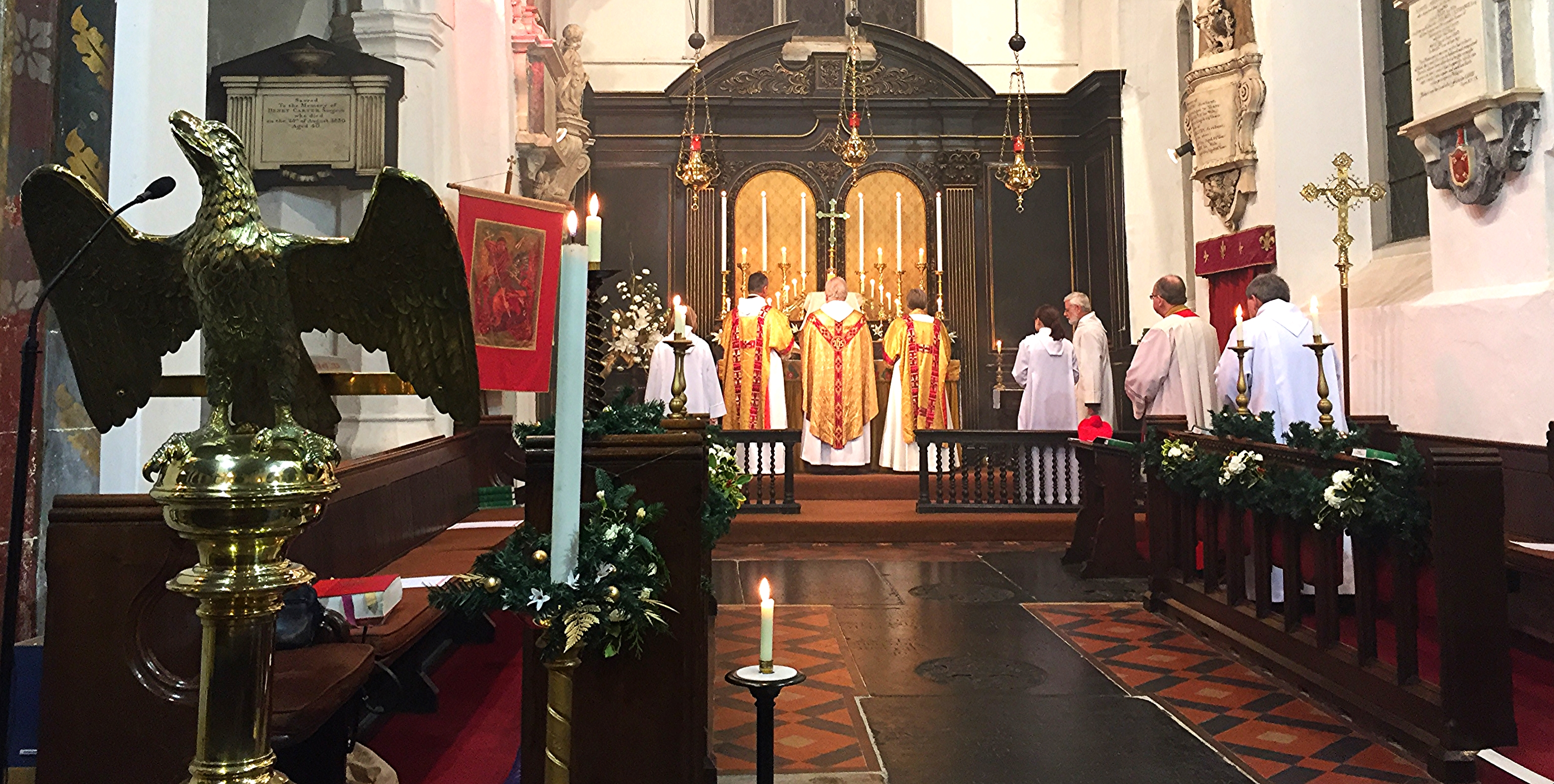
Chancel
