= St Gregory's Church, Norwich =

St Gregory's Church
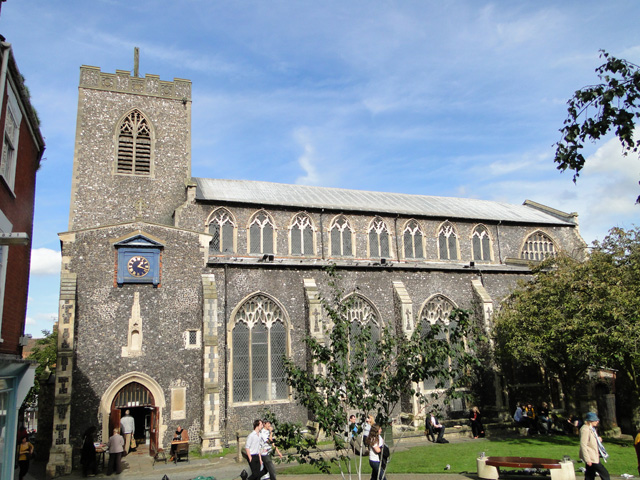
- St Gregory's Church, Norwich
- St Gregory's Church
- 52°37′49.44″N 1°17′29.4″E
- OS grid reference: TG 22845 08711
- Location: Norwich, Norfolk
- Country: England
- Denomination: Church of England

History
- Dedication: St Gregory

Architecture
- Heritage designation: Grade I listed

St Gregory's is a Grade I listed redundant parish church in the Church of England in Norwich.

== History ==
The church, which stands between Pottergate and St Benedict's Street, is medieval. The body of the church dates back to a 14th-century rebuilding, although the tower is older. St Gregory's is noted for its wall-paintings, discovered in 1999, which include a depiction St George and the dragon at the west end of the north aisle.

There is a public passageway under the chancel, which was rebuilt in 1394. The west tower once had a lead-covered spire, bearing the date 1697, but this was removed in 1840.

Most of the stained glass dates back to the late 19th century, and was made by J and J King of Norwich.

In 1971, the church was closed, and from 1975 to 2002 it was used as a community arts venue. Work was done to install toilets in the north porch, lay a wooden floor over the original floor, and add stepped staging to the chancel. In 1999, an important group of wall paintings were discovered in the church. An agent for the Norwich Historic Churches Trust ran the building as a venue for events from 2007 to 2011. It was used as an arts centre, which closed in September 2012. The next year, it was leased out as an antiques centre, St Gregory's Antiques & Collectables. It remains as such as of 2026, attracting around 400 visitors daily.

The church is on Historic England's Heritage at Risk Register, listed as being in a poor condition with high vulnerability. In 2026, after Norwich Historic Churches Trust warned that the west wall of the church was at risk of collapsing into St Gregory's Alley, it was announced that urgent repairs were to be carried out, approved by Norwich City Council. Repairs have been financed by a £250,000 grant from the National Lottery Heritage Fund.

== Organ ==
The church has an organ dating from 1887 by Norman Brothers. A specification of the organ can be found on the National Pipe Organ Register.

== Sources ==
- Pevsner, Nikolaus (1962). North East Norfolk and Norwich. The Buildings of England (1st ed.). Penguin Books.
