= St Augustine's Church, Norwich =

Grade I listed church in Norfolk, England

Coordinates: 52.6372°N 1.2925°E

St Augustine's Church
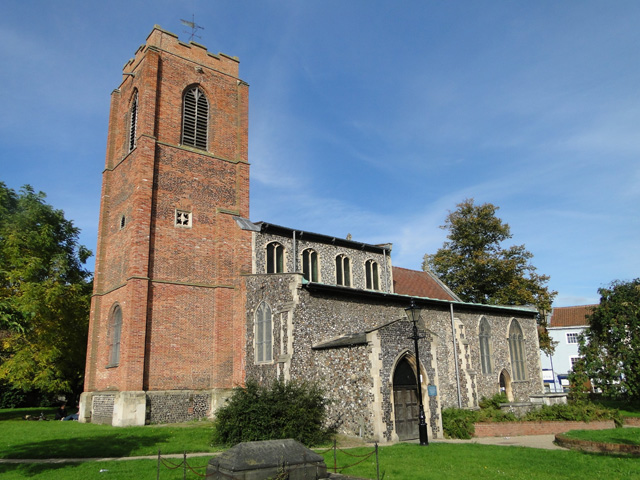
- St Augustine's Church, Norwich, from the southwest

- Location in Norfolk
- OS grid reference: TG 228 095
- Location: St Augustine's Street, Norwich, Norfolk
- Country: England
- Denomination: Anglican
- Website: visitchurches.org.uk/visit/our-churches/noa

History
- Dedication: Augustine of Canterbury

Architecture
- Functional status: Active
- Heritage designation: Grade I
- Designated: 26 February 1954
- Architect: R. M. Phipson (restoration)
- Architectural type: Church
- Style: Gothic

Specifications
- Materials: Flint with stone and brick dressings Brick tower

St Augustine's Church is an Anglican church building in the city of Norwich, Norfolk, England. It is a designated Grade I listed building. The church stands in an area named Gildencroft, on the west side of St Augustine's Street and opposite the junction with Botolph Street, and has a large churchyard spanning an acre.

== Dedication ==
St Augustine's is the only medieval church in Norfolk with a dedication to St Augustine. This dedication refers to Augustine of Canterbury, not Augustine of Hippo, as guild returns during the reign of Richard II refer to the church as "Seynt Austyn anglorum episcopi" (bishop of the English).

== History ==
=== Norman church ===
Dating from the 12th century, the church was likely outside the edge of Norwich at the time of its establishment, being about 125 metres (137 yd) south of the c. 1300 city wall. The earliest documentary evidence of a church dedicated to St Augustine in Norwich dates from 1163 in a letter from the bishop of Norwich, William de Turbe, to the prior of Llanthony Secunda Priory in Gloucester. This evidence concerns Wulfhrac and Herbert, two brothers who were both priests and who according to Brian Ayers et al. possibly founded the church. The brothers granted the church to the priory and one of its canons, Roger of Norwich became the church's prior. Brian Ayers et al. have suggested that St Augustine's may have been an early 'missionary' outpost to convert pagans or peasants. In the 14th century, there is evidence of the existence of a guild of poor men after which Gildencroft, the area where the church is located, is likely named, though this area has been referred to as such since the 13th century.

During the priorate of Roger Skerning, the advowson of St Augustine's was transferred to Norwich Cathedral priory from Llanthony, an arrangement following a settlement with one Bartholomew prior of Llanthony and one Richard of Norwich. Skerning then appointed rectors to the church, the earliest known being John de Blickling in 1303. Nothing of the Norman church survives.

=== 15th century rebuilding ===
The church was substantially rebuilt in the early 15th century. The tower was added in 1682–87 after the flint tower collapsed. The date 1687 was added, presumably on completion, to the east-facing parapet. In the 1880s R. M. Phipson restored part of the fabric of the church and reordered the interior. The parishioners of the church were known as 'red steeplers'.

In 1954 St Augustine's became a Grade I listed building, though during the 20th century the condition of the building had deteriorated. By the 1990s the tower had become dangerous and the church's three 17th-century Norwich-made bells (which pre-date the new tower) were removed and donated to All Saints’ Church, Carleton Rode. The church was declared redundant on 18 March 1975, and was vested in the Churches Conservation Trust on 19 April 2000. As of 2000, the congregation meets in the church hall, but the church is still used on high days and holidays.

== Architecture ==
=== Exterior ===
The body of the church is constructed in flint with stone and brick dressings. The church is square in plan, with the nave and chancel being similar in length, and the aisles running along their full length.

The nave is tall. It has four bays, and thus four clerestory windows on each side; these are two-light windows with Decorated tracery. There is also a clerestory extending along the length of the nave, which has four two-light windows on each side containing Y-tracery. There is a south porch of the 19th century.

The chancel is in two bays, with three-light Perpendicular windows in the aisles, and a five-light east window. The chancel roof is steep and tiled, and drops down to the lead aisle roof which is nearly flat. The building had gargoyles and sound-holes, which are from the original church. There is a rood turret against the wall of the north aisle.

The tower, of the late 17th century, is in brick on a flint plinth, and is the only one of its kind in the city. At the west end of the church, it is in three stages. In the lowest stage is a west window with a pointed arch. The middle stage contains small square windows on each side, and in the top stage the bell openings have two lights. The parapet, of the 19th century, is rendered and battlemented.

=== Interior ===
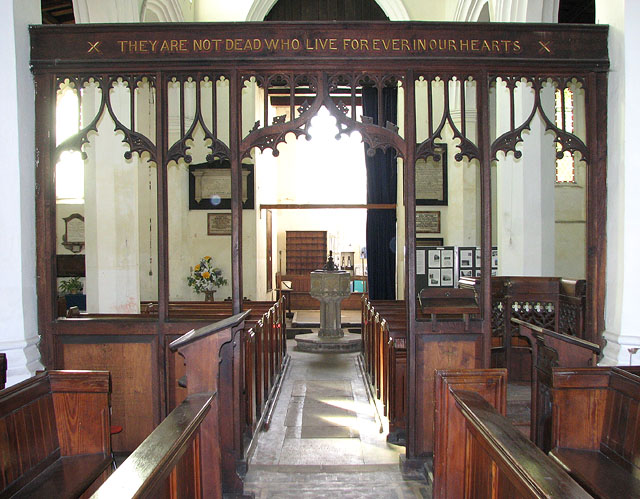
The church interior from behind the chancel screen

The arcades are carried on octagonal piers. The font dates from the 15th century. The pews and the reredos are from the 1880s, and the chancel screen, which incorporates the pulpit and a reading desk, was added in 1920 as a memorial to those who died in the First World War. Alongside memorials to his other family members, there is a marble wall monument to the Palladian architect Matthew Brettingham, who designed Holkham Hall. It reads:

of this city, Architect who departed this earthly residence Aug 19 1769. As a man his integrity, liberal Spirit and benevolence of Mind endeared him to all that knew his Virtues and his Talents as an Architect, to the Patronage and esteem of the Nobility the most distinguish'd for their love of Palladian Architecture.

There is another memorial to a textile manufacturer, Thomas Clabburn, erected by "upwards of six hundred of the weavers of Norwich and assistants".

On the west wall of the north aisle, there is a framed panel of the original church rood screen, which depicts Saint Apollonia with long, wavy hair, holding large pincers and a tooth, though this is faded.

A mural memorial in the north nave aisle commemorates a merchant born in Boston, Massachusetts, Thomas Churchman Newman, who died in Norwich in 1787. He was an older brother of Robert Newman (sexton), whose belfry signal sparked off the American Revolution in 1775. There is little stained glass; that in the east window dates from 1870, and the glass in the north chancel aisle, depicting SS Felix of Dunwich and Augustine of Canterbury, dates from 1901. A window in the south nave aisle, depicting the Virgin Mary, Mary Magdalene and an angel at the empty tomb of Jesus Christ, dates from 1918 and is a memorial to a soldier of the parish who was killed in action in 1917.

The two-manual organ was transferred from St Peter's Church, Hungate. It was built in 1875–78 by John Rayson, and restored in 1959–60 by Hill, Norman & Beard.

== War memorials ==
There are four different memorials associated with the First World War in the church. The largest is the Roll of Honour inscribed on the chancel screen. This oak screen is imitative of a medieval rood screen with Gothic tracery above and panels below. According to the Faculty notes, it was designed by Mr. F. Varney of Messrs Morgan & Buckingham of Norwich and was made for a cost of £90 by Howard & Sons, the Norwich Ecclesiastical Wood Carvers; the money raised by the parish's 'working class Parishioners'. Two panels on the east-facing side commemorate individual soldiers connected with the church (a Sunday school teacher, Rifleman Edward Halfacre, Post Office Rifles and a teacher and member of the choir, Private Edward Sizer, Army Service Corps) and a panel on the far left has a record of the Roll of Honour's presentation by the Bishop of Norwich, the Rt Rev Bertram Pollock on Sunday 25 January 1920. The west-facing side lists 79 servicemen who died on active service or shortly after discharge. It is unusual in mentioning the name of Private John Henry Abigail of the 8th Battalion, Norfolk Regiment, shot for desertion in France 12 September 1917, a very rare example of an executed British serviceman of the 1914-18 war being listed on a local war memorial. Private Abigail was pardoned by HM Government in 2006. The memorial also includes names of one man who served in the Australian Imperial Force, Lance Corporal Clarence Neasham; three who served in the Canadian Expeditionary Force, brothers Private George and Lance Corporal Arthur Howell and Private Thomas Crosskill; one who served in the American Expeditionary Force, Private James Cooke; and one who service in the Royal Naval Air Service and Royal Air Force, Air Mechanic Frank Brighty.

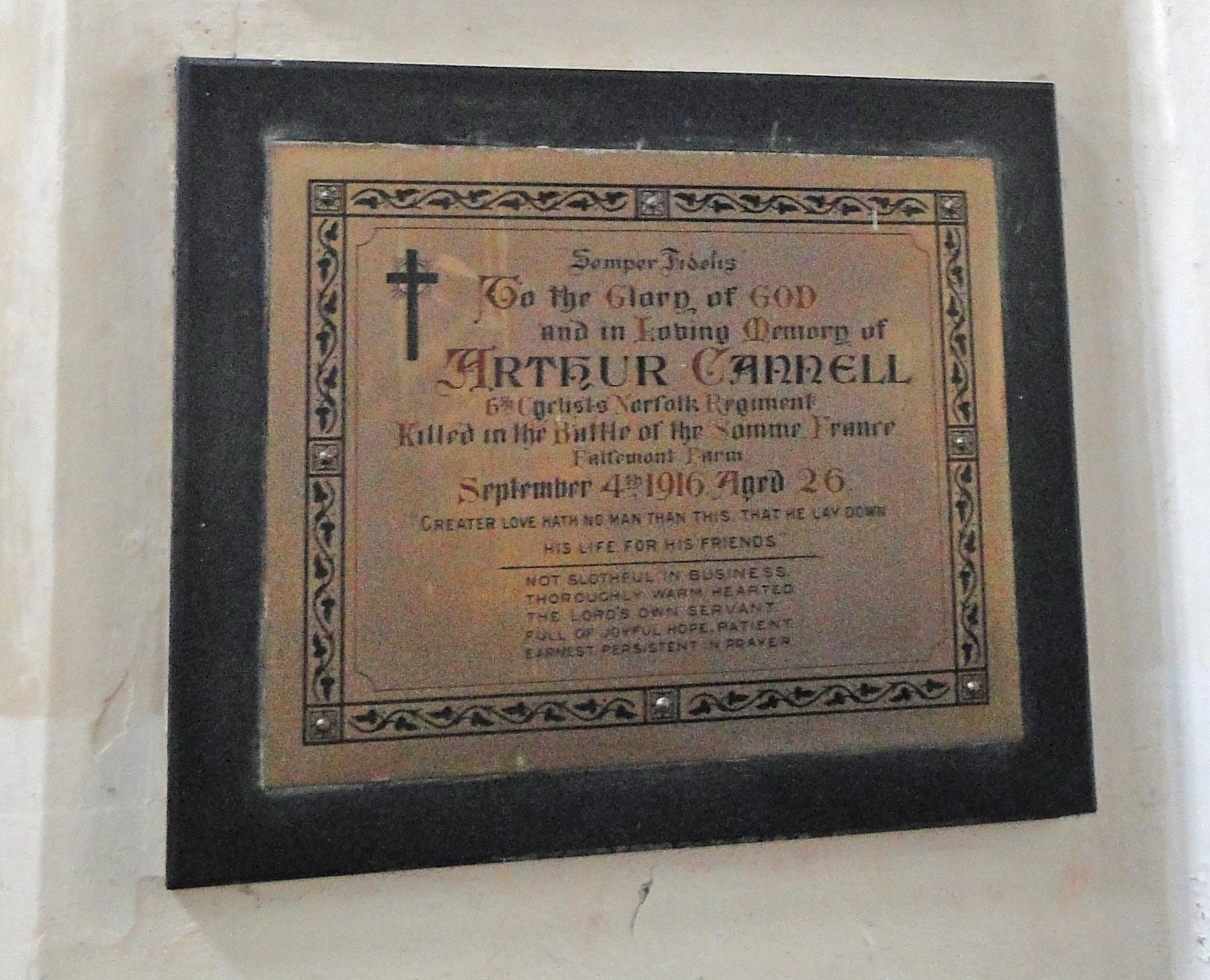
Memorial to Lance Corporal Arthur Cannell (d. 4 September 1916)

There are additional memorials to individuals. Lance Corporal Arthur Cannell of the 6th (Cyclist) Battalion and 1st Battalion, Norfolk Regiment was killed in the Battle of the Somme on 4 September 1916 at the age of 26. The brothers Second Lieutenant Bertie W. Benn and Second Lieutenant Walter H. Benn (both promoted from the ranks) are commemorated on a marble plaque erected by their parents Mr. J and Mrs. E Benn. Bertie Benn was killed in the Battle of the Somme on 19 July 1916, aged 27, and Walter H. Benn died in action in France on 2 August 1917, aged 26. A memorial stained glass window designed by George Skipper and manufactured by Morris & Co. is dedicated to Lance Corporal Leonard Harry Pert of the 8th Battalion, Rifle Brigade, killed at the Battle of Arras on 3 May 1917. The window depicts the Virgin Mary and Mary Magdalene before an angel at the empty tomb of Jesus. There is also a memorial to the parish's war dead of the Second World War that lists the names of eight servicemen and five civilians, including four from one family killed during the Baedeker Blitz on Norwich on 27 April 1942.

== Parish ==
The origin of St Augustine's parish in Norwich is debated based on tithing obligations to the Gildencroft, with a long-term argument that the parish as well as the parish of St Martin at Oak were 'cut out' of the parish of St Clement Colegate and a more recent hypothesis that St Clement's parish was part of an 11th-century manor which 'procured' parts of other parishes in some manner. Brian Ayers et al. have argued that the latter argument is unlikely for St Augustine's parish as it was likely only established in the 12th century.

== See also ==
- List of churches preserved by the Churches Conservation Trust in the East of England
