= Dragon Hall, Norwich =

Grade I listed hall in Norwich, England

Dragon Hall
- The Old Barge
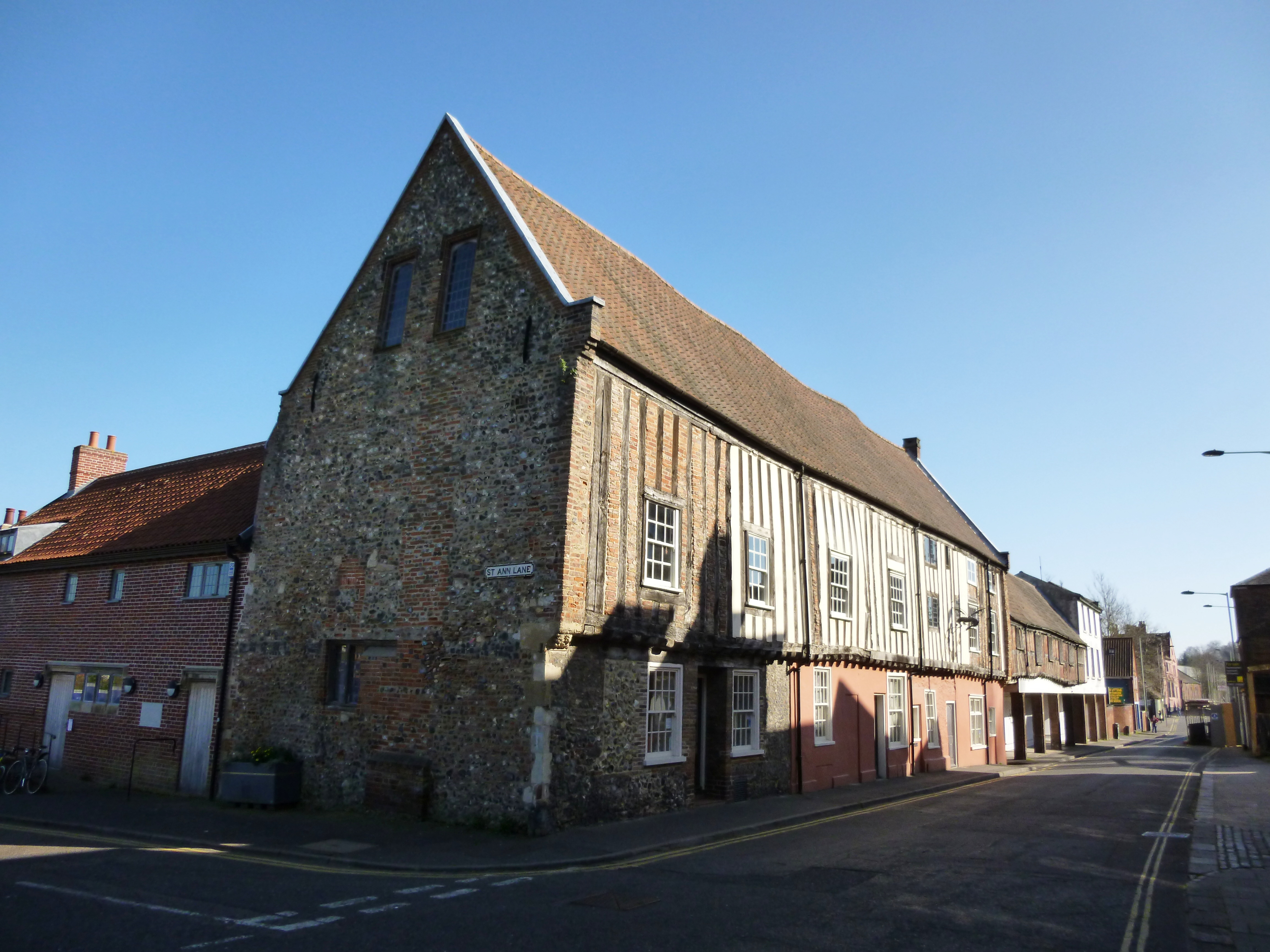

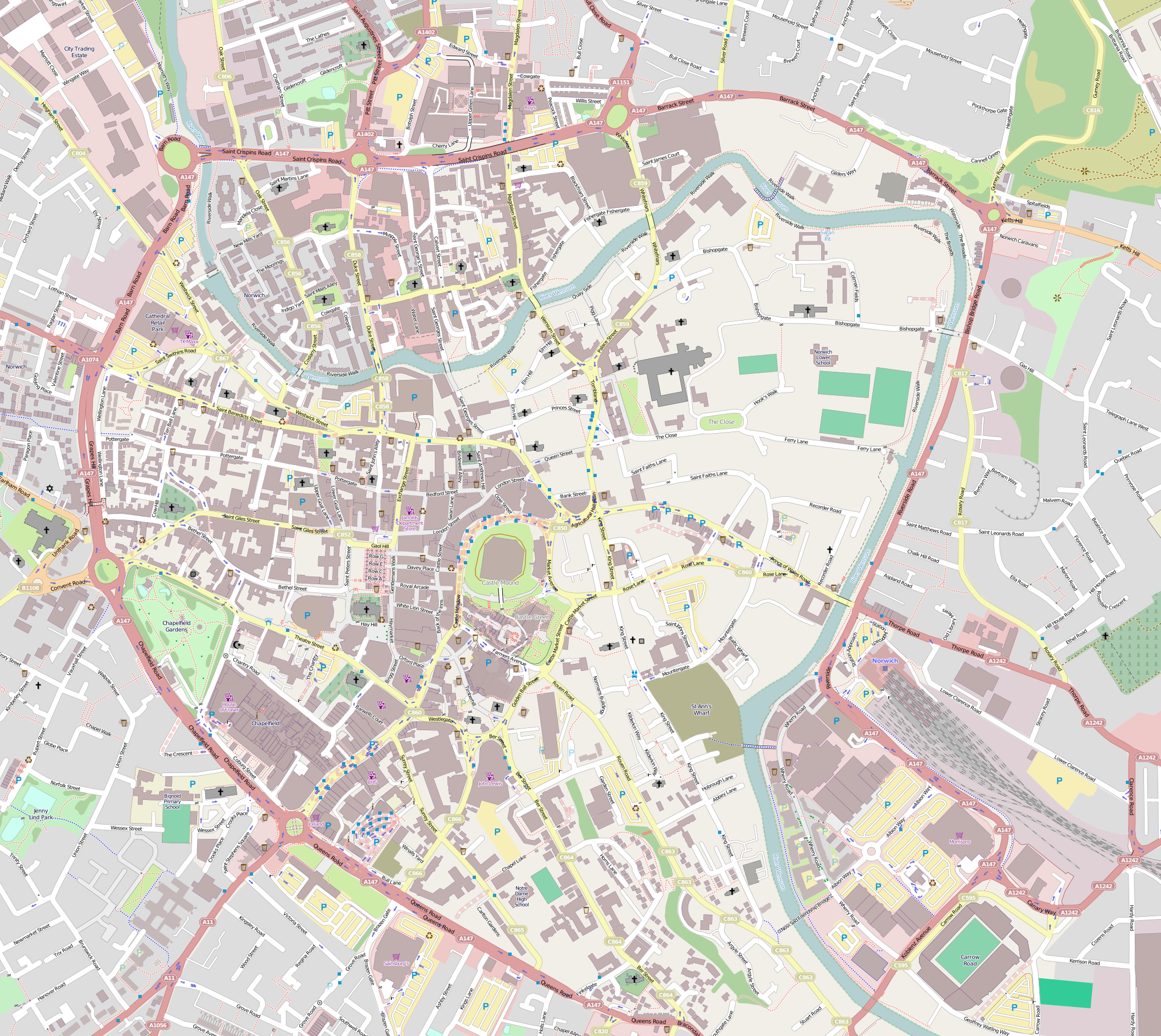
- Location within Norwich Location within Norfolk
- 52.6253°N 1.3014°E
- Location: Norwich, Norfolk

History
- Built: 14th century with 15th century rebuilding and additions

Listed Building – Grade I
- Designated: 26 February 1954
- Reference no.: 1051236

Dragon Hall is a Grade I listed medieval merchant's trading hall located in King Street, Norwich, Norfolk, close to the River Wensum, and since 2018 home to the National Centre for Writing. It is thought to be unique in being the only such trading hall in Northern Europe to be owned by one man. The building stands on what was the main road through the city in the 15th century, with river transport links via Great Yarmouth to the Low Countries. Dragon Hall is now acknowledged as one of Norwich's medieval architectural gems and an iconic building in the city.

The Great Hall on the first floor was built in the 15th century, but some parts of the site are older. Archaeological research shows evidence of an Anglo-Saxon hut c.1000 beneath the Hall. On the northern part of the site, in the late 13th century, the abbey at Woburn, Bedfordshire, had a fish processing operation with various outbuildings and a track to a staithe or quay. There was also a boundary wall with a large brick arch to give access to King Street. In about 1330 an L-shaped domestic 'hall house' owned by John Page was built on the southern part of the site with an undercroft and an entrance on the south side from Old Barge Yard.

In about 1427 Robert Toppes, a Norwich merchant, re-developed the site as a commercial complex. He built his first-floor trading hall on top of part of the 14th-century domestic hall house and on top of the existing boundary wall and brick arch. He retained the 14th-century entrance to the hall house for his customers. From the entrance passage his customers went up a new staircase to the first-floor trading hall. This was a timber construction of seven bays with a crown post roof, decorated with carvings in the spandrels of 14 dragons. The hall was constructed with English oak, using some 1,000 trees. At the rear of the building he created a yard space with access to the river for his imports and exports, a warehouse area under the hall and a new stairway down to the extended undercroft from the yard. Part of the hall house was retained as a ground-floor reception area.

== Robert Toppes ==
Little is known of the origins of Robert Toppes, who during the 1420s bought the land where Dragon Hall now stands. He was an exporter of worsted and an importer of finished textiles, iron goods, wine and spices. He rose to become an important figure in the politics of the city of Norwich, becoming the city's Treasurer before he was 30, and later becoming Sheriff. He became mayor on four separate occasions and represented the city as its member of parliament four times. He was involved in a disputed election which resulted in him being exiled to Bristol. and he was indicted in the aftermath of 'Gladman's Insurrection' in 1443.

Toppes' second wife, Joan Knyvett, was a friend of the Pastons, who are famous for the Paston Letters. He owned numerous properties throughout East Anglia. He paid for a large stained-glass window in the church of St Peter Mancroft, panels of which have survived. When he died in 1467, he provided priests to pray for his soul, paying for this by the sale of Dragon Hall which he referred to a 'Splytt's'.

== 1467 to 1960s ==
After being sold in 1467, the hall was gradually divided into smaller and smaller houses; the original bay windows were replaced with sash windows and doors; and windows were inserted into the King Street frontage. The internal structure was redesigned, with the insertion of attics, new floors and cellars. The building became known as The Old Barge Building, named after the pub which occupied the southern end. Poor quality tenements were gradually built up behind the building and in Old Barge Yard, the lane on the southern side. By the 19th century some 150 people were known be living in The Old Barge building and in the tenements behind and at the side.

In 1936 a Slum Clearance programme was implemented, which removed most of the slum housing at the back of the site and in Old Barge Yard. By the 1950s the building looking onto King Street had a butcher's shop at the northern end, the rectory for the parish of St Julian and St Peter Parmentergate in the middle, and The Old Barge pub at the southern end. In 1954 the building was awarded Grade I listed building status.

== Restoration 1970s to 2006 ==
Following deeper examination by the Norwich Survey, based at the University of East Anglia, architectural historians and other interested people realised that the building was of great historical importance and a committee was set up to restore the hall. In 1979 Norwich City Council bought the building which was by then uninhabited and a major programme of fund raising, restoration and research began. The Norfolk and Norwich Heritage Trust was formed to run the hall; partition walls, attic floors, chimneys and fireplaces were removed and the hall was restored to something like its original state. In 1986 it was renamed as 'Dragon Hall' and became a heritage attraction, a resource for the local community and an educational centre. In 1997/98 there was a major archaeological investigation of the area behind the Hall. Following a major Heritage Lottery Fund grant in 2005/06, further improvements were made, including the addition of a north wing with displays, a lift, offices, a kitchen and a meeting room.

== The National Centre for Writing ==
In 2015 the lease of the premises was taken over by the Writers’ Centre Norwich, and in 2016 the Norfolk and Norwich Heritage Trust was wound up. In 2018 the Writers Centre Norwich became the National Centre for Writing, and they added a new South Wing with extensive office and meeting spaces. An existing 19th-century cottage on the site was also converted as a residential facility for visiting writers and translators. The Dragon Hall Volunteers were re-constituted as the Dragon Hall Heritage Volunteers, and they continue to act as tour guides, to give external talks to local clubs and societies and to act as guardians and promoters of the heritage of Dragon Hall by the creation of an archive of documents and photographs. They also have a Local History Study Group.

== Public access ==
Guided tours of Dragon Hall, bookable via the National Centre for Writing website, are normally available once or twice a month. On the Heritage Open Days in September, additional tours have in previous years been organised, and special tours and bookings by groups can also be arranged.

== Sources ==
- Richardson, Douglas; Everingham, Kimball G.; Faris, David (2011). Plantagenet Ancestry: A Study In Colonial And Medieval Families (2nd ed.). Salt Lake City: Douglas Richardson. p. 91. ISBN 9-781-44996-631-7.
