= St George Colegate =

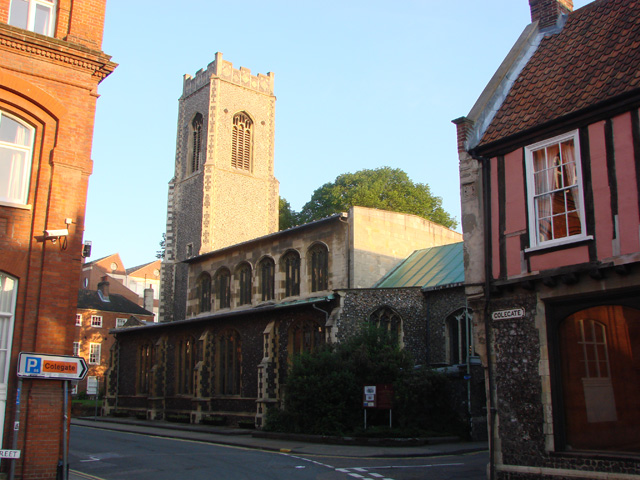
- St George Colegate in 2009
- St George Colegate
- 52°37′59.51″N 1°17′38.04″E
- OS grid reference: TG 22995 09032
- Location: Norwich, Norfolk
- Country: England
- Denomination: Church of England
- Churchmanship: Central
- Website: Church website

History
- Status: Active
- Dedication: St George

Architecture
- Functional status: Parish church
- Heritage designation: Grade I listed

Administration
- Province: Province of Canterbury
- Diocese: Diocese of Norwich
- Archdeaconry: Archdeaconry of Norwich
- Deanery: Norwich East
- Parish: St George Colegate

Clergy
- Rector: The Revd Alaric Mark Lewis

St George Colegate is a Grade I listed parish church in the Church of England in Norwich.

== History ==
The church is medieval. The nave and tower date from 1459 and the chancel from 1498. The aisles and chapels are 1505 and 1513.

== Organ ==
The church contains an organ which dated from 1802 by George Pike England. A specification of the organ can be found on the National Pipe Organ Register. As a mark of its historic value, the organ has been awarded an Historic Organ Certificate by the British Institute of Organ Studies.
