= George Plunkett (photographer) =

English photographer

George Arthur Frank Plunkett (March 1913–2006) was an English photographer. Plunkett was born in Norwich, and from 1931 to 2006 he built a comprehensive photographic survey of his home city and further afield. His written work includes five papers for the Norfolk and Norwich Archaeological Society, published in the society's transactions, and two published books.

From February 2016, a permanent exhibition of Plunkett's work has been on show in the George Plunkett Room at the Sir Garnet pub in Norwich, close to the market square.

== Biography ==
After attending Avenue Road School and later the City of Norwich School, Plunkett commenced work at the Norwich Public Health Department in March 1929. During the Second World War, he served with the RAF from January 1941 to February 1946. After the war ended, he returned to work in his previous employment, where he met his future wife, Margaret. The couple had two sons. Plunkett retired from the local authority in March 1973 and worked for Norwich Union before retiring in March 1978, aged 65.

== Photographic career ==
Plunkett started photographing Norwich in 1931 after acquiring a box camera. Realising its limitations, he replaced it the following year with an Ensign Carbine Number 7, which he used for the rest of his career. In 2000, his complete collection of Norwich photographs were made available on the internet.

== Publications ==
- Disappearing Norwich (1987) ISBN 0-861380576
- Rambles in Old Norwich (1990) ISBN 0-861380789
