= St Martin at Oak =

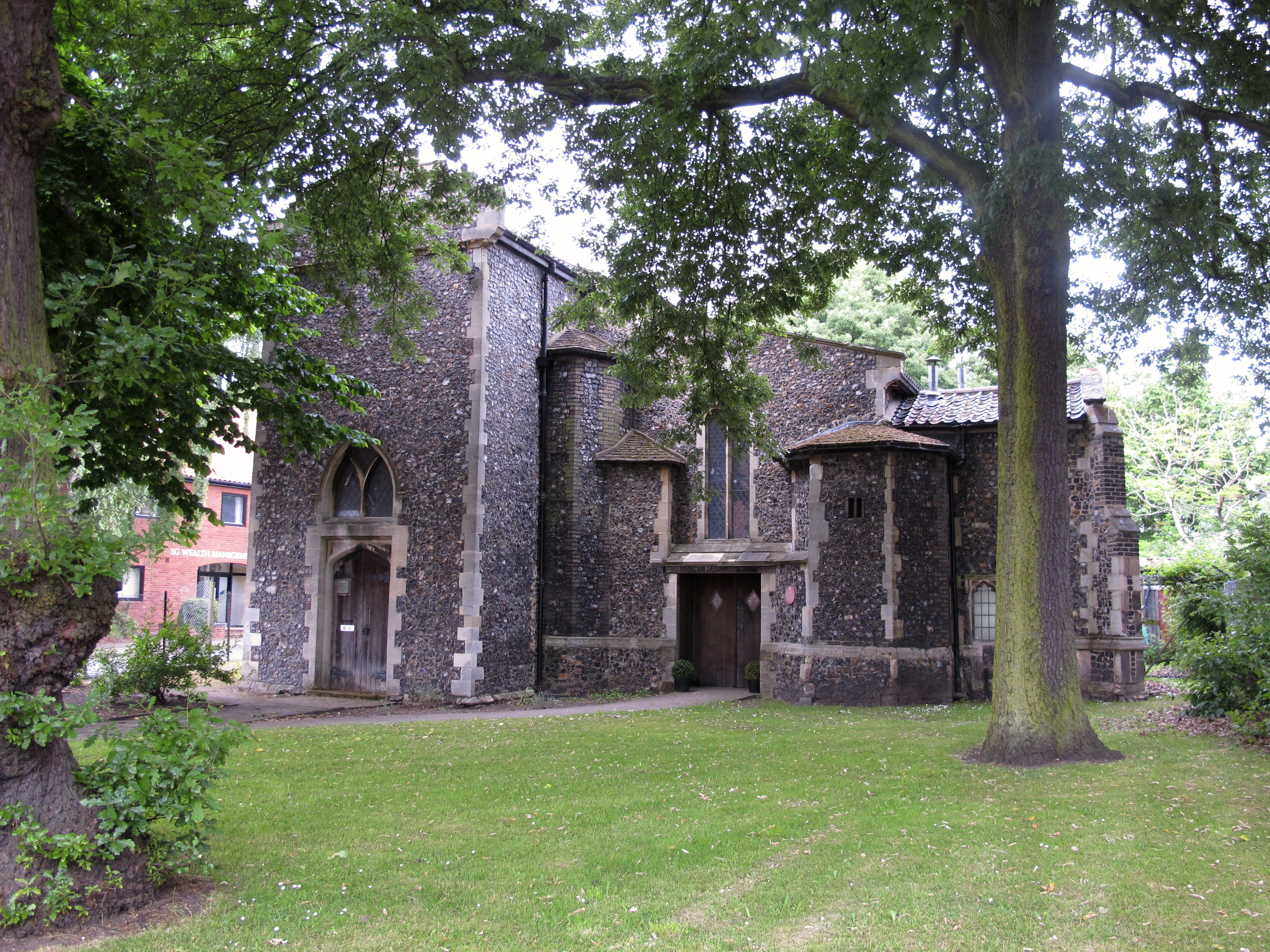
- St Martin at Oak in 2013
- St Martin at Oak
- 52°38′5.31″N 1°17′24.74″E
- OS grid reference: TG 22737 09200
- Location: Norwich, Norfolk
- Country: England
- Denomination: Church of England

History
- Dedication: St Martin

Architecture
- Heritage designation: Grade I listed

St Martin at Oak is a Grade I listed redundant parish church in the Church of England in Norwich.

== History ==
The church is medieval dating from before 1491.

It lost its tower to bomb damage in 1942. It was rebuilt in 1953 by the architect John Chaplin as a church hall for neighbouring parishes, with the chancel arch being bricked up that decade, leaving the nave as a large hall. Its existence as a church hall never materialised as the local churches were closed in the 1960s.

The Night Shelter relocated to St Martin at Oak from St James Pockthorpe in 1976, using the nave as a dormitory and the chancel as a common room. Additionally, the arcade was glazed, and office, showers, and toilets were installed in the aisle. The Night Shelter remained at St Martin's until it moved to the Bishopbridge House in 2002. For a very short time, artists rented the church. In 2012, the Wharf Music Academy began renting the church; they replaced the showers with soundproof teaching pods and in 2013 upgraded the chancel into office space and a kitchen. After repairs to internal plasterwork, in December 2024 the Men's Shed became a tenant.

== Organ ==
The church purchased an organ dating in 1887 by Norman and Beard. A specification of the organ can be found on the National Pipe Organ Register. When the church closed for worship, the organ was transferred to St Bartholomew's Church, Corton, Suffolk.
