= List of churches in Norwich =

The following is a list of churches in Norwich. The churches listed lie within the boundary of Norwich City Council and do not include those of some of the city's outlying suburbs.The city of Norwich (within its medieval walls) at one time had 57 parish churches, the largest collection of urban medieval buildings in any city north of the Alps.

== Churches that hold services ==
Name	Ward	Image	Reference	Founded	Denomination	Benefice	Notes
Bowthorpe Church	Bowthorpe			1984	see Notes		"...a local ecumenical partnership between the Church of England, the United Reformed Church, the Methodist Church and [the] Baptists..."
Bowthorpe Road Methodist Church	Wensum			c. 1950s	Methodist	Norwich Circuit	
St Athanasius Coptic Orthodox Church	Marlingford Road, Easton			2008	Coptic Orthodox	St Athanasius Church	
Cathedral of St John the Baptist, Norwich	Nelson			1882–1910	Roman Catholic	St John the Baptist Cath.	Cathedral of Diocese of East Anglia 1976
Chapel Field Road Methodist Church	Town Close			pre-1881	Methodist	Norwich Circuit	Current building 1881
Christ Church, Eaton	Eaton				Church of England	Eaton Parish	
Christ Church New Catton	Sewell			1840-1841	Church of England		First church to be built outside the city walls.
Eternity Church	Bowthorpe				?		
Greek Orthodox Church of the Mother of God	Thorpe Hamlet			1934	Greek Orthodox		
Heartsease Lane Methodist Church	Crome						
Holy Apostles SS Peter & Paul, Norwich	University				Roman Catholic		
St George, Sprowston	Catton Grove			1962	Roman Catholic	St George	
Mile Cross Methodist Church	Catton Grove			1933	Methodist	Norwich Circuit	
Oak Grove Community Church	Catton Grove				?		
St Francis, Heartsease	Crome			1956	Church of England		Francis of Assisi
Witard Road Baptist Church	Crome			1958-1959	Baptist Union		
RCCG The Chapel Norwich	Crome			1998	RCCG		Current building at 193 Plumstead Rd, Norwich NR1 4AB
St Andrew, Eaton	Eaton			Medieval	Church of England	Eaton Parish	Mostly meets in new church building next door, built 1993
Ipswich Road URC, Norwich	Eaton			1952	URC		Originally plant from Princes St Congregational
St Elizabeth, Earlham	Wensum				Church of England	Earlham Parish	
St Mary, Earlham	University			Medieval	Church of England	Earlham Parish	
St Anne, Earlham	University				Church of England	Earlham Parish	
University of East Anglia Catholic Chaplaincy	University				Roman Catholic		Masses twice a week
Jessopp Road URC, Norwich	University				URC		About to join St Peter's Methodist as a Methodist/URC partnership
UEA Quaker Meeting	University				Quakers		
Servant's Church	University				Calvary Chapel		
St Catherine, Mile Cross	Mile Cross			1936	Church of England		
St Luke, New Catton	Mile Cross			1990	Church of England	St Luke & St Augustine	
Proclaimers	Sprowston East				Hillsong		Outside Norwich City boundary
Soul Church Norwich	Heartsease				Independent		
St Mary Magdalene, Norwich	Sewell			1902-1903	Church of England		
Rosebery Road Methodist Church	Sewell			1908	Methodist	Norwich Circuit	Congregation may be older
St Augustine, New Catton	Mancroft			Medieval	Church of England	St Luke & St Augustine	Old building redundant 1997 (CCT 2000), now meets in nearby hall
St Barnabas, Heigham	Mancroft			1903	Church of England	St Thomas	Now part of St Thomas Norwich
St George Colegate	Mancroft			Medieval	Church of England		
St Andrew, Norwich	Mancroft			Medieval	Church of England		Current building 1469-1506
St Giles on the Hill	Mancroft			Medieval	Church of England		Restored 1866-1867
St Peter Mancroft	Mancroft			Medieval	Church of England		Greater Churches Network
St Stephen, Norwich	Mancroft			Medieval	Church of England		
St John Timberhill	Mancroft			Medieval	Church of England	SS John the Baptist & Julian	
St Alexander Nevsky Orthodox Ch, Norwich	Mancroft			2016	Russian Orthodox		
Norwich Central Baptist Church	Mancroft			C17th	Baptist Union		2003 merger of St Mary's, Dereham Rd & Mile Cross Baptist churches
Old Meeting House Congregational Church	Mancroft			C16th	Cong Federation		Current building 1693
Surrey Chapel	Mancroft			1844	FIEC		
Norwich Salvation Army Citadel	Mancroft				Salvation Army		Mile Cross Salvation Army is just outside city boundary
Norwich Quaker Meeting	Mancroft				Quakers		
Norwich Seventh-Day Adventist Church	Mancroft			1970s	7th-Day Adventist		
Potter's House Norwich	Mancroft			1984	Potter's House		Building previously home to Dereham Road Baptist
Octagon Chapel, Norwich	Mancroft			1680s	Unitarian		Current building 1756. Presbyterian until early C19th
St Thomas, Norwich	Nelson			1880s	Church of England	St Thomas	Holy Trinity Brompton church plant 2013
St John the Theologian, Norwich	Nelson				Archdiocese of Russian Orthodox Churches in Western Europe		Meets in Trinity URC. Previously met in St John de Sepulchre (below)
St Peter's Methodist Church, Park Lane	Nelson			1939	Methodist	Norwich Circuit	About to join Jessopp Road URC as a Methodist/URC partnership
Trinity URC, Norwich	Nelson			1867	United Reformed Church		Built 1956 on the site of the redundant Unthank Road Baptist Church demolished in 1955
Holy Trinity, Heigham	Town Close			1861	Church of England		
St Alban, Norwich				1932-1937	Church of England	St Thomas	Now part of St Thomas Norwich
Norwich Elim Church	Town Close				Elim		
Norwich Cathedral	Thorpe Hamlet			Medieval	Church of England		Dedicated to the Holy & Undivided Trinity
St George Tombland	Thorpe Hamlet			Medieval	Church of England		
St Helen, Norwich	Thorpe Hamlet			Medieval	Church of England		Only part of the giant building is still used as a church; dedicated to Helena, mother of Constantine
St Julian, Norwich	Thorpe Hamlet			Medieval	Church of England	SS John the Baptist & Julian	Bombed in 1942, rebuilt in 1953 mainly due to the connection of the church with the medieval mystic Julian of Norwich
St Matthew, Thorpe Hamlet	Thorpe Hamlet			1981	Church of England		Replaced Victorian church on different site (see below)
Princes Street URC, Norwich	Thorpe Hamlet			1819	URC		Current building 1868
Norwich Evangelical Free Church	Thorpe Hamlet				Independent		
King's Community Church Norwich	Thorpe Hamlet				Newfrontiers		Meets in 3 locations across the city
Methodist	Norwich Circuit	New building 1954 after original bombed					
St Mark, Lakenham	Lakenham			1840s	Church of England		
St John the Baptist & All Saints, Lakenham	Lakenham			Medieval	Church of England	Lakenham	
St Paul, Tuckswood	Lakenham			1969	Church of England	Lakenham	

== Closed church buildings ==
The Norwich Historic Churches Trust (NHCT) maintains and repurposes redundant church buildings in Norwich.

Name	Image	Foundation date/period	Year closed	Denomination	Notes
Holy Apostles Jesuit Chapel		1829	1880s	Catholic Church	Dedicated to the Apostles. No longer needed once the cathedral was built
St Michael, Hellesdon				Church of England	Dedicated to Michael. Benefice with St Paul's & St Mary's, outside city. No Sunday services but midweek groups.
All Saints, Norwich		Medieval	1973	Church of England	Dedicated to All Saints. NHCT. Since 2015 used as an antique centre and tearoom:
St Clement Colegate		Medieval, probably 11th century	1971	Church of England	Dedicated to Clement. NHCT. Formerly used as a stonemason's lodge. Currently in use as a crafts person and builder's store
St Edmund, Fishergate		Medieval	1950s	Church of England	Dedicated to Edmund the Martyr. NHCT. Formerly used as a cardboard box store for the factory across the road. Since then it has been restored and is currently in use by Call to Prayer
St Etheldreda, Norwich		Medieval	1961	Church of England	Dedicated to Æthelthryth. NHCT. Currently in use as St Etheldreda's Artist Studio
St Gregory, Pottergate		Medieval	1971	Church of England	Dedicated to Pope Gregory I. NHCT. Currently being rented as an antiques centre, run by the same people that run the All Saints Antiques Centre
St James the Less, Pockthorpe		Medieval	1972	Church of England	Dedicated to James the Less. NHCT. Home to Norwich Puppet Theatre since 1980
St John de Sepulchre		Medieval	1984	Church of England	NHCT. AKA John the Theologician. Currently in use as a wedding and ceremonies venue run by The Flint Rooms
St John Maddermarket		Medieval	1982	Church of England	Dedicated to John the Baptist. Used by Greek Orth. 1982–1990. Churches Conservation Trust
St Laurence, Norwich		Medieval	1968	Church of England	Dedicated to Lawrence of Rome. Churches Conservation Trust
St Margaret, Norwich		Medieval	1975	Church of England	Dedicated to Margaret the Virgin. NHCT. Known as the Church of Art due to its use as a venue for art exhibitions
St Martin at Oak		Medieval	1960s	Church of England	Dedicated to Martin of Tours. NHCT. Currently in use as a music school and performance space run by The Wharf Academy
St Martin at Palace		Medieval	1971	Church of England	Dedicated to Martin of Tours. NHCT. This is Norwich Historic Churches Trust's base of operations. It includes a visitors' centre as well as the Trust's administrative offices
St Mary Coslany		Medieval	1971	Church of England	Dedicated to Mary, mother of Jesus. NHCT. In use by a publishing service and an internet book-seller
St Mary the Less, Norwich		Medieval	1544	Catholic Church	Dedicated to Mary, mother of Jesus. Used by a variety of denominations ever since
St Matthew, Thorpe Hamlet (old)		1851	1970s	Church of England	Dedicated to .Matthew the Apostle New St Matthew's built further from city centre (see above). Now offices
St Michael at Plea		Medieval	1971	Church of England	Dedicated to Michael. NHCT. Currently rented to a Christian bookshop. It also has a cafe/tearoom and hosts a range of talks and events
St Michael (Miles) Coslany		Medieval	1971	Church of England	Dedicated to Michael. NHCT. Currently in use by The Oak Circus Centre and home to the Lost in Translation Circus Company
St Peter Hungate		Medieval	1936	Church of England	Dedicated to Peter. NHCT. Since 2009 it has hosted the Hungate Medieval Art, an exhibition space celebrating Norwich's Medieval heritage and art
St Peter Parmentergate		Medieval	1980	Church of England	Dedicated to Peter. NHCT. Currently home to Amanda Bradbury, an integrative counselling specialist
St Saviour's, Norwich		Medieval	1970s	Church of England	Dedicated to Jesus. NHCT. Now it is the Thalia Theatre Company, an educational arts related learning provider for disabled people with a focus on physical and sensory impairments and learning difficulties
SS Simon & Jude, Norwich		Medieval	1892	Church of England	Dedicated to Simon & Jude. NHCT. Taken over by Curious Directive in 2018, it is used as a shared workspace for freelancers working in creative industries
St Swithin, Norwich		Medieval	1951	Church of England	Dedicated to Swithun. NHCT. Home to Norwich Arts Centre since 1980
Silver Road Baptist Church				1910	Baptist Union

== Ruins ==
Name	Image	Foundation date/period	Year closed/destroyed	Denomination	Notes
St Michael & All Angels, Bowthorpe		Medieval	1790s	Church of England	Dedicated to Michael & Angels. Bowthorpe Church now situated next to ruins
St Bartholomew, Ber Street		Medieval	by 1550	Catholic Church	Dedicated to Bartholomew. Piece of ruined tower remains
St Bartholomew, Heigham		Medieval	1942	Church of England	Dedicated to Bartholomew. Destroyed by bombing during Baedeker Blitz 27-29 April 1942; only tower remains
St Benedict, Norwich		Medieval, probably 11th century	1942	Church of England	Dedicated to Benedict of Nursia. Destroyed by bombing June 1942; only tower remains
St Peter Southgate, Norwich		Medieval	1880s	Church of England	Dedicated to Peter. Demolished, ruins still extant.

== Lost churches ==
Name	Image	Foundation date/period	Date lost/destroyed	Denomination	Notes
All Saints, Fyebridgegate		Medieval	Gone by 1551	Catholic Church	
St Botolph		Medieval	Gone by 1548	Catholic Church	Dedicated to Botolph The site of the church was destroyed when Anglia Square was built in 1974.
St Christopher, Norwich		Medieval, possibly late Saxon, listed in Domesday	13th century	Catholic Church	Dedicated to St Christopher, one of only 9 pre-Reformation dedications to the saint in England Destroyed by fire and not rebuilt
St Clement Conesford		Medieval	16th century	Catholic Church	Dedicated to Clement of Rome.
St Crowche		Medieval	Gone by 1551	Catholic Church	
St Martin at Bale		Medieval	Gone by c. 1558	Catholic Church	
St Mary in the Marsh, Norwich		Medieval	1564	Church of England	Dedicated to Mary, mother of Jesus. Parish church for old cathedral close. Demolished upon redundancy
St Mary Unbrent		Medieval	Gone by c. 1540	Catholic Church	
St Michael at Thorn, Norwich		Medieval	1942	Church of England	Dedicated to Michael. Damaged and burnt out by bombing 27 June 1942 and demolished during the 1950s. Porch incorporated into rebuilding of St Julian.
St Michael, Conesford		Medieval	C16th	Catholic Church	Dedicated to Michael.
St Olave		Medieval	1546	Catholic Church	Dedicated to xxx
St Paul, Norwich		Medieval	1942	Church of England	Dedicated to Paul. Damaged by bombing 27 June 1942 and demolished during the late 1950s.
St Philip, Heigham		1872	1972	Church of England	Dedicated to Philip. Demolished 1975
Baptist Chapel, St Mary's Plain					Damaged and burned out in 1942
Trinity Presbyterian Church, Theatre Street		1867		URC	Destroyed by enemy bombing in 1942. Site cleared for city regeneration and the new Norwich Central library built there. Congregation moved to Unthank Road

== Sources ==
- Ayers, Brian (1994). Norwich. London: B.T. Batsford Ltd; English Heritage. ISBN 9780713475685.
- Rawcliffe, Carole; Wilson, Richard, eds. (2004). Norwich Since 1550. New York; London: Hambledon and London. ISBN 1 85285 450 2.
