= St Clement Colegate =

- St Clement Fyebridge
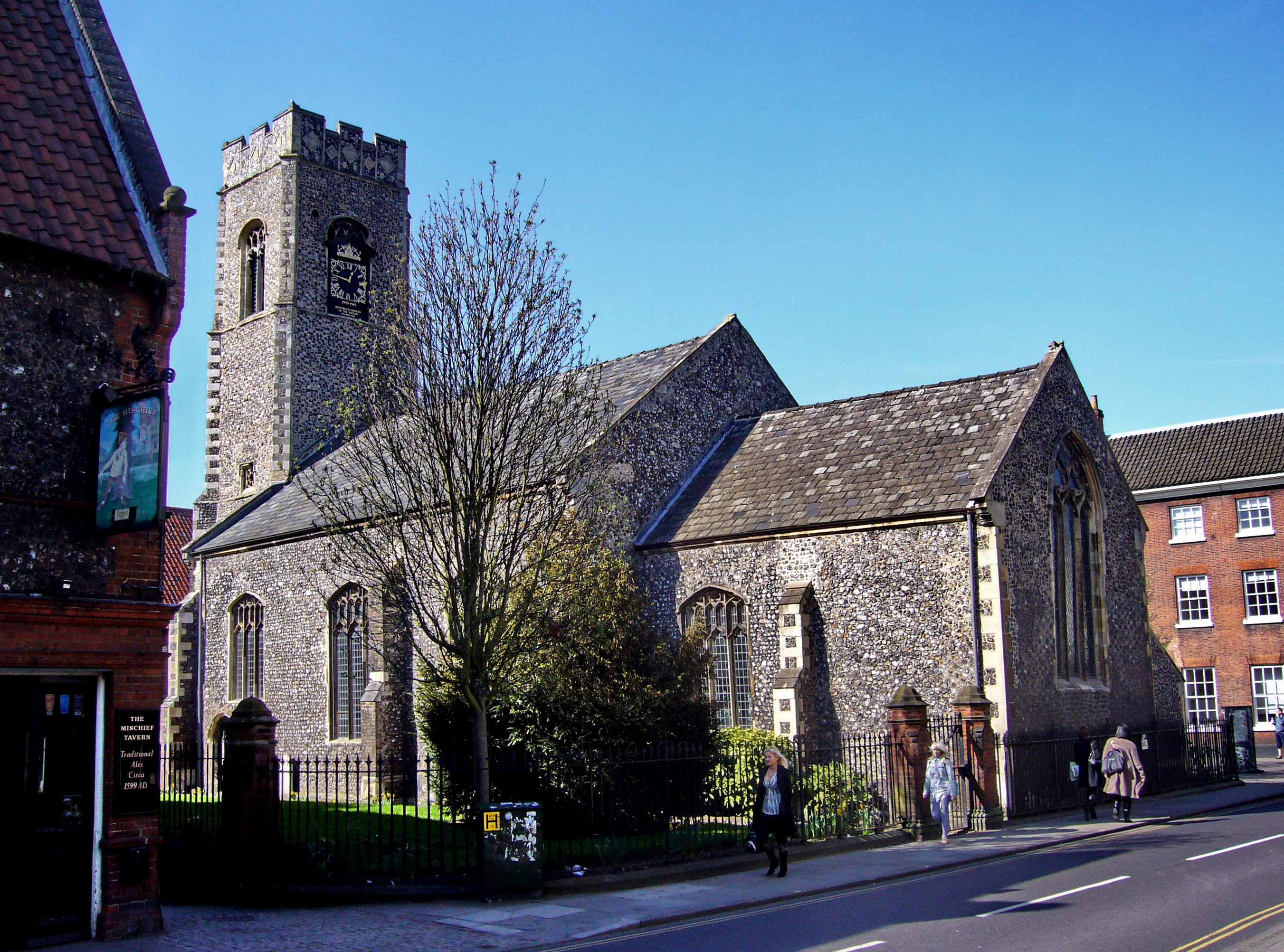
- St Clement Colegate in 2011
- St Clement Colegate
- 52°37′59.49″N 1°17′47.88″E
- OS grid reference: TG 23179 09044
- Location: Norwich, Norfolk
- Country: England

History
- Dedication: Clement of Rome

Architecture
- Heritage designation: Grade I listed

St Clement Colegate, also known as St Clement Fyebridge, is a Grade I listed redundant parish church in Norwich, Norfolk in England. It is one of two churches in the city that were dedicated to Clement of Rome, the other being the now lost St Clement Conesford. Located on an 'island' site (surrounded by footways) on Fyebridge Street and Colegate, near to Fye Bridge, it is constructed of flint with stone and brick dressings and a slate roof, and has a wide aisleless nave, a chancel without chapels, and a west tower with a clock and crenellated parapet.

It is debated as to whether St Clement's is one of the first churches erected on the north side of the river Wensum in the city, though it likely had a foundation in the Anglo-Saxon period, possibly in the early 11th century. It was given to Stoke by Clare Priory between 1090 and 1121, though after a dispute between 1173 and 1182, its advowson was instead granted to Mendham Priory. Its benefice passed to Gonville and Caius College post-Reformation. It became one of the main Ritualist churches of the city in the later 19th century. It was made redundant in the 1960s, though was host to a place of all faith prayer and meditation under the Reverend Jack Burton from 1977 until 1999, after this hosting a Romanian Orthodox congregation until 2015. It was subject to two arson attacks in 1991 and 2007. It is, as of 2026, host to an independent contractor and joiner focused on vernacular building methods.

== Dedication ==
St Clement Colegate is dedicated to the Bishop of Rome Saint Clement, being one of 56 known pre-Reformation churches with this dedication in England, of which seven are in Norfolk, and two are in Norwich, the other being the now lost St Clement Conesford. The church was a patron of seafarers and was popular with the Danes, linking to the manner in which Clement was martyred by being tied to an anchor and thrown into the sea. The area was also at risk from inundation, a connection to the idea that Saint Clement's tomb would be revealed by receding waters once a year. Its location next to a river is shared by many other churches with the dedication, particularly St Clement's in Cambridge.

== History ==
The church is thought by some historians to be one of the first churches erected on the north side of the river; Francis Blomefield called it "one of the most ancient in the city". It is of Anglo-Saxon foundation, though there is only circumstantial evidence of this. B. E. Crawford has argued that it was founded in the early 11th century, and was newer than its neighbours. The earliest direct documentary evidence is dated to between 1090 and 1121, and details that St Clement's was given to Stoke by Clare Priory in Suffolk by Roger de Gisney I. This gift was confirmed by the Bishop of Norwich Herbert, then by Bishop Everard in c. 1140 and the Archbishop of Canterbury Theobald in c. 1150.

A dispute arose by the later 12th century concerning ownership of the church between three clerks of Robert de Gisney II and the Stoke by Clare Priory, as recorded in a charter of Earl of Hertford Richard de Clare dated between 1173 and 1182. Gilbert Foliot, Bishop of London, arbitrated the dispute as papal judge delegate, deciding that while the church did not belong to Stoke by Clare priory, it could have two thirds of the tithes of St Clement's parish. The advowson of the church was instead given to Mendham Priory, also in Suffolk, by Ingelram de Gisney according to his daughter and heir Emma in 1250. Mendham would retain the church until the 16th century. In the Valuation of Norwich in 1254, the church was referred to as St Clement ad Pontem and was assessed at £2, tying with St Giles' for the fourth highest valuation in the city. It was rated at £4 13s 4d in the papal taxation of 1291, putting it in sixth place in the city alongside St Michael Coslany.

In 1515, according to Francis Blomefield, Mendham Priory nominated its final rector, Roger Cockson, and after this Edmund and then Robert Wood acquired the advowson. Both Edmund and Robert, father and son, would go on to be Mayor of Norwich. In 1524, they presented as rector Richard Cockson. In 1547, Edmund Wood and John Baker, who had become churchwardens, confirmed to the King's Commission that in 1546, churchwardens Robert Kennow and John Mase had sold church plate worth £37 10s 8d, spending £17 19s 8d of this on removing images, whiting, leading, and repairing the church. The benefice of the church then passed to Gonville and Caius College following the Reformation.

In the later 19th century, the church became one of the city's main Ritualist churches, switching quickly due to extreme evangelicalism. After this the church became abandoned due to the development of industry and poor-quality housing in the area. In 1912, flood water damaged the church. It became Grade I listed in 1954.

=== Redundancy and use by other denominations ===
After being made redundant in the 1960s it was used for counselling and pastoral work, keeping its furnishings. In 1969, the Reverend Jack Burton first preached at the church, though St Clement's largely stood empty.

In 1977, Burton gained permission from the Norwich Historic Churches Trust (NHCT), which cares for the church, to rent it personally repurpose it as a place of prayer and meditation for all faiths. It was open daily, though Burton also gave services including an annual Christmas Midnight Mass. This lasted until 1999. An arson attack occurred at the church in 1991, leading the NHCT to restore the tower. After 1999, it was converted to house a Romanian Orthodox congregation until 2015. After a second arson attack in 2007, the NHCT redecorated the interior. In May 2011, it was noticed that the hands of the clock on St Clement's were spinning backwards; this had likely occurred after electricity was restored to the clock after power cut within that month. The NHCT apologised.

After 2015, St Clement's housed Gildencraft, an apprenticeship scheme for stonemasons from then until 2018. An independent contractor and joiner focused on vernacular building methods then took over.

== Architecture ==
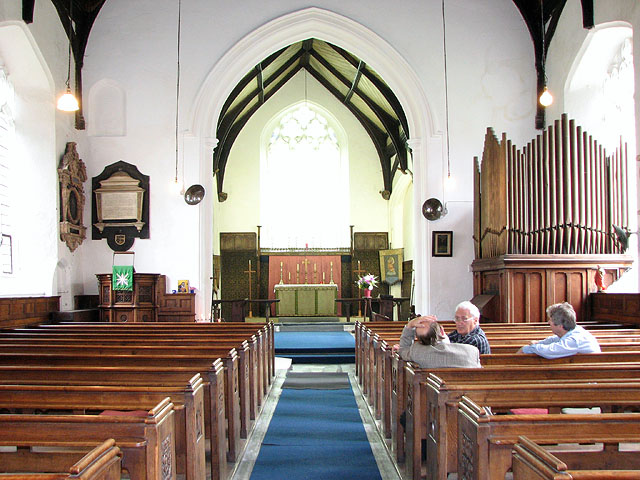
The interior of St Clement Colegate in 2010, then host to a Romanian Orthodox congregation

The church has a nave, a chancel, and a west tower, all in the Perpendicular style and likely dating from the 15th century, none of the present fabric being from before the 14th century. It is made of flint, with stone and brick dressings, and its roofs are slate. The roofs of both chancel and nave are arch-braced from wall posts.

The nave present today, of the 1440s according to Ayers et al, replaced an earlier nave which was narrower and had a steeper roof; quoins from the original nave are visible embedded in the walls of either side of the tower. This earlier version of the church may have had no architectural division in plan nor elevation between its nave and chancel, similar to St Edmund's. It is now of three bays, wide but without aisles, and relatively short. In 1547, plans had been brewing for four years to add aisles to the church using the money earned from the sale of church plate, however this was never realised. It has a low pitched roof, its interior braced roof involving principals with A-frame arch-braced collars. Its windows are four-centred and three-light and have shouldered ogees that support pairs of batements, with the central batement pairs being topped by a quatrefoil. The cill of the nave's west windows are raised to accommodate the north and south doors. There are no porches on the church, though the nave has a north and a south door. The south door is of the mid-15th century and is well preserved, having been covered by a south porch until 1799; the flint work is rougher around the south door of the nave as a result of its removal. The mouldings on the north door were reused and badly reset in the 15th century. A chancel arch was constructed after the new nave.

The chancel, of two bays, had its side walls reconstructed. It has on its sides three-light Perpendicular windows that have four-centre arches, very similar to those in the nave and likely added when the new nave was constructed. It also has an east window which is in a Decorated style with reticulated tracery, dating from before the 15th century, possibly c. 1350. This window's authenticity has been doubted as possibly being a Victorian insertion, though two early 19th century drawings by Thomas Kerrich depict the window as it appears in the present. Inside the chancel, there are wall arches which enclose deeply recessed windows or sections of blank wall. The chancel roof has arched bracing with its wall posts supported on corbels which are carved to represent angels bearing shields, with two of these holding trumpets. A 1391 bequest to the chancel ceiling by Thomas Birkeley may have funded this. The lower brace springs from nail-posts. North of the chancel, there is a 19th century vestry. The chancel has no chapels.

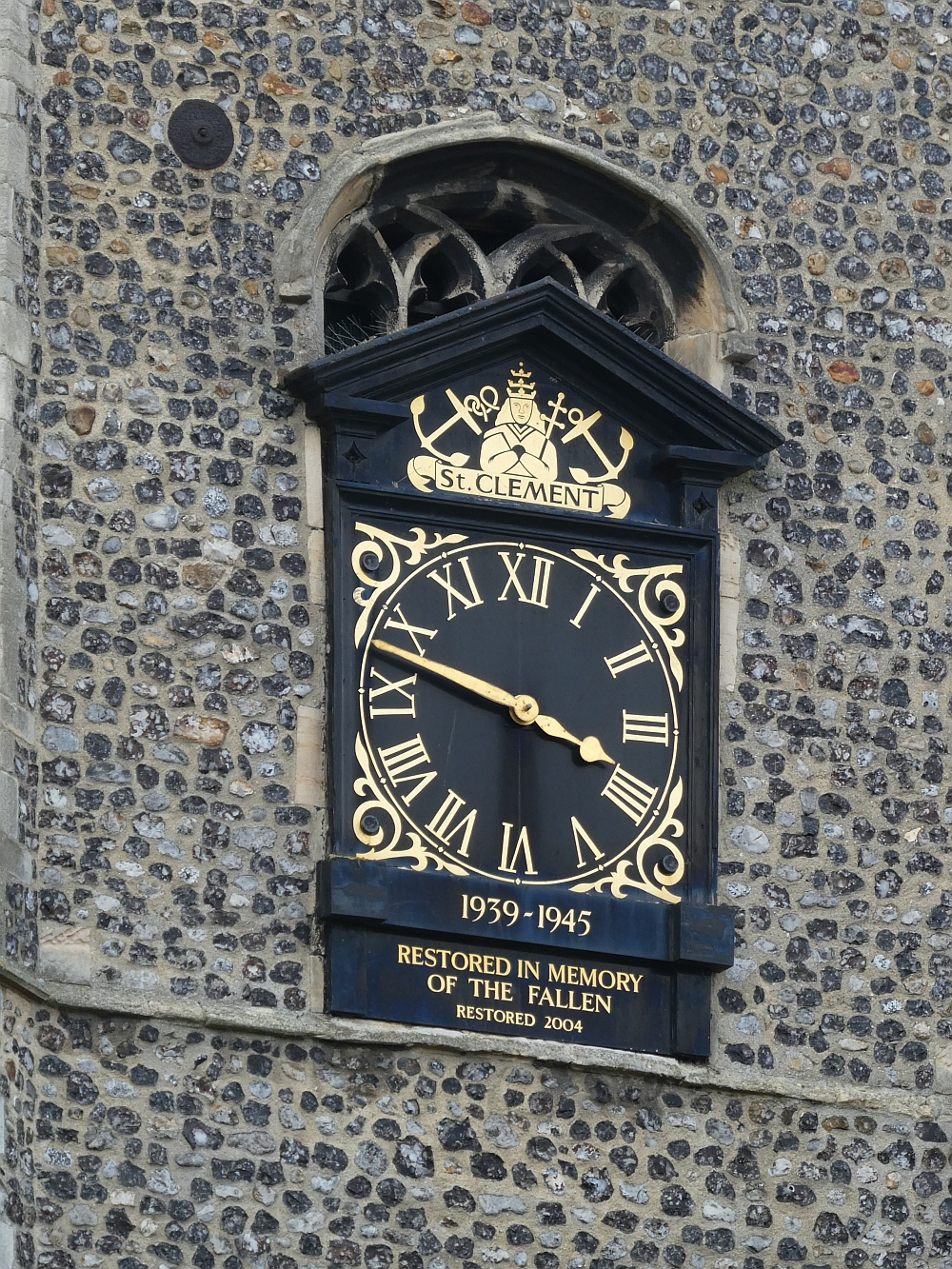
The clock on the east side of the tower in 2021

The tower, with three stages, is slender, and was built onto the earlier nave. It features diagonal corner buttresses at each stage, and a stair turret on the north-east corner. Its north-east and south-east buttresses have ashlar quoins, though only above the height of the original nave. The tower arch takes up the full width of the tower interior. There is another three light Perpendicular west window on this tower, with shouldered ogees, as well as square sound-holes with tracery featuring a central circle with eight roundels, itself surrounded by a circle. There are also two-light belfry windows with four-centre arches. The tower has a crenellated parapet which has flushwork decoration of freestone lozenge panels featuring shields. This parapet is dateable to the 15th century; the leading of the tower was paid for by Adam Gosselyn as stated in his will of 26 March 1438, proved on 3 August 1440, meaning the tower was at full height by this point. The tower had a spirelet as of 1828, which is no longer present. There is a clock on the tower's east side, with a classical frame, partly covering a medieval belfry window.

== Furnishings ==
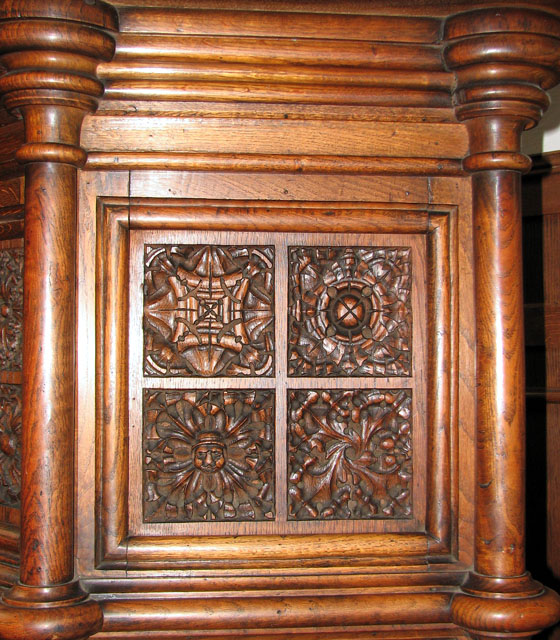
Details of the carvings on the St Clement Colegate pulpit

There were in the past, as noted by Blomefield, images in the church of the Virgin Mary, as well as saints Clement, Catherine, Agnes, James, Andrew and Michael. There were altars to Mary (a Lady altar) and to John the Baptist, though their locations are unclear.

All present furnishings date to the 1889 restoration of the church by HJ Green, which in turn removed a west gallery of 1846, a two-storey pulpit, and box pews. Currently there are benches with panels on the ends that are carved in the same manner as the framed panel carvings of flowers and leaves on the present pulpit and Perpendicular font. This font was likely made in Norwich in the mid-15th century, sharing elements with the font from St Simon and St Jude's, probably made by the same mason. There is also an oak chest with a semi-cylindrical lid, measuring 1.05 metres (3.4 ft) in width, 0.5 metres (1.6 ft) in depth, and 0.53 metres (1.7 ft) in height. It is studded and banded in iron, though its cross bolt and padlocks are missing.

The church contained an organ originally by G.M. Holdich but this organ was moved to All Saints church in 1889 following a new Norman & Beard organ replacement. The current organ is one originally made by Rothwell in 1944 that was modified in 1966 by Ralph Bootman.

== Monuments and burials ==
Rector John Savage requested burial in the church in his will in 1448, giving 46s 8d for the 'reparation' of glass in a window in the chancel depicting the history of John the Evangelist. Geoffrey Qwynsy, 1454 Sheriff of Norwich, requested burial in the chancel in his 1461 will; there was a brass to him which was eventually drawn by John Kirkpatrick and later seen by Blomefield, though by this time it was in the nave. Robert Gylmin, a glazier and apprentice of Thomas Felippe who became a freeman in 1474/75, as well as a constable in the Northern Ward from 1480–86 and a councillor there from 1493–94, asked to be buried in the churchyard in his will of 1499. The wealthy Thomas Hemmyng, who instead lived in the parish of St Michael Coslany, made a request to be buried in St Clement's in his 1504 will, also gifting his own black worsted and directing that they cover the upper and lower parts of the church's altars. He also directed a cross, a chalice and a pair of censers to be made from silver plate in his possession, worth a total of £21. Much of this church plate was sold in 1546.

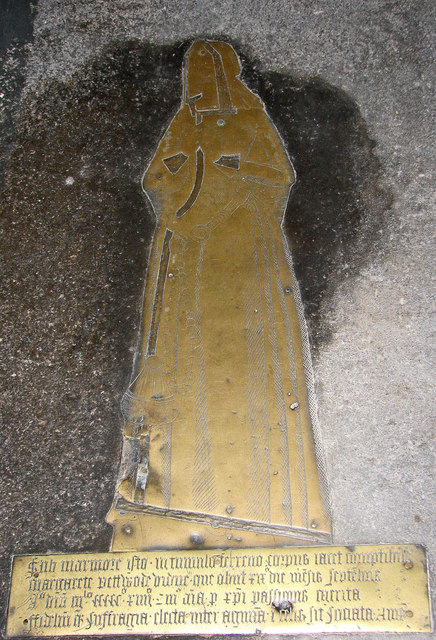
A 1514 brass memorial to Margaret Petwoode is located in the nave floor

In the floor of the church nave, there is a brass memorial to Margaret Petwoode which is dated to 1514. This has an uncommon design, Petwoode depicted facing slightly left rather than face-on as is usual for brasses, and it also would have featured coloured enamels in the recesses made in her gown. There is a brass missing from a floor slab inside the main door, which may have been that of the memorial of the wife of mid-16th century Mayor of Norwich Edmund Wood, Elizabeth. She was buried "before the aulter of Our Lady", and Edmund requested burial next to his late wife in front of the Lady altar prior to his 1548 death, though Elizabeth is not directly named in his will. Blomefield recorded the inscription on her brass:

O Jesu for thy Holy Name, and thy most precious Blood, have mercy on the Soul of Elizabeth Wood, Whiche in December the fourteenth Daye, The Soule from her Body thou tookest awaye, In the Year of our Lorde 1546, then, Jesu have Mercy on her Soule, Amen.

There was also a brass of one Agnes Wood, whose identity is less certain as there are only records of an Agnes being the wife of Norwich lyster Richard Wood; this Agnes was pregnant and requested burial in St Clement's in her May 1525 will, fearing death in her childbirth. She bequeathed her best bed sheet to the church, instructing for its separation into two parts for the creation of two altar cloths. Blomefield also recorded her inscription:

Of your Charite pray for soule of Agnes late the wife of Edmond Wood which departed July xxv. XVo. Xxiiij. Of whose soule Jesu have mercy.

Edmund's son Robert Wood, also a mayor of the city, was buried in the chancel. The Wood family were responsible for the construction of the King of Hearts building across the road.

There are further monuments to the Harvey and Ives families, the former being wool merchants and the latter merchants and bankers, both being much intermarried and giving the city several mayors during the 18th century. Monuments to Jeremiah Ives (d. 1742) and John Harvey (d. 1514) are two of these; they are opposite each other across the nave. There is a 19th-century reconstruction of a box tomb in the south churchyard that is inscribed to the memory of the parents of Matthew Parker, Archbishop of Canterbury under Elizabeth I.

Blomefield also described a tomb in the churchyard of St Clement's which was in a north-south orientation, unusual in Christian norms. He noted a legend that it was the tomb of a wealthy 'leper' whose burial the parish had agreed to accept after several other parishes had refused to bury him, in return for substantial endowments of property. Blomefield himself questioned several aspects of this legend, arguing that because the leper house outside St Augustine's Gate did not have its own burial ground, its residents had a parochial right to be interred at St Clement's churchyard. He did not question why the individual was placed in a tomb.

== Location ==
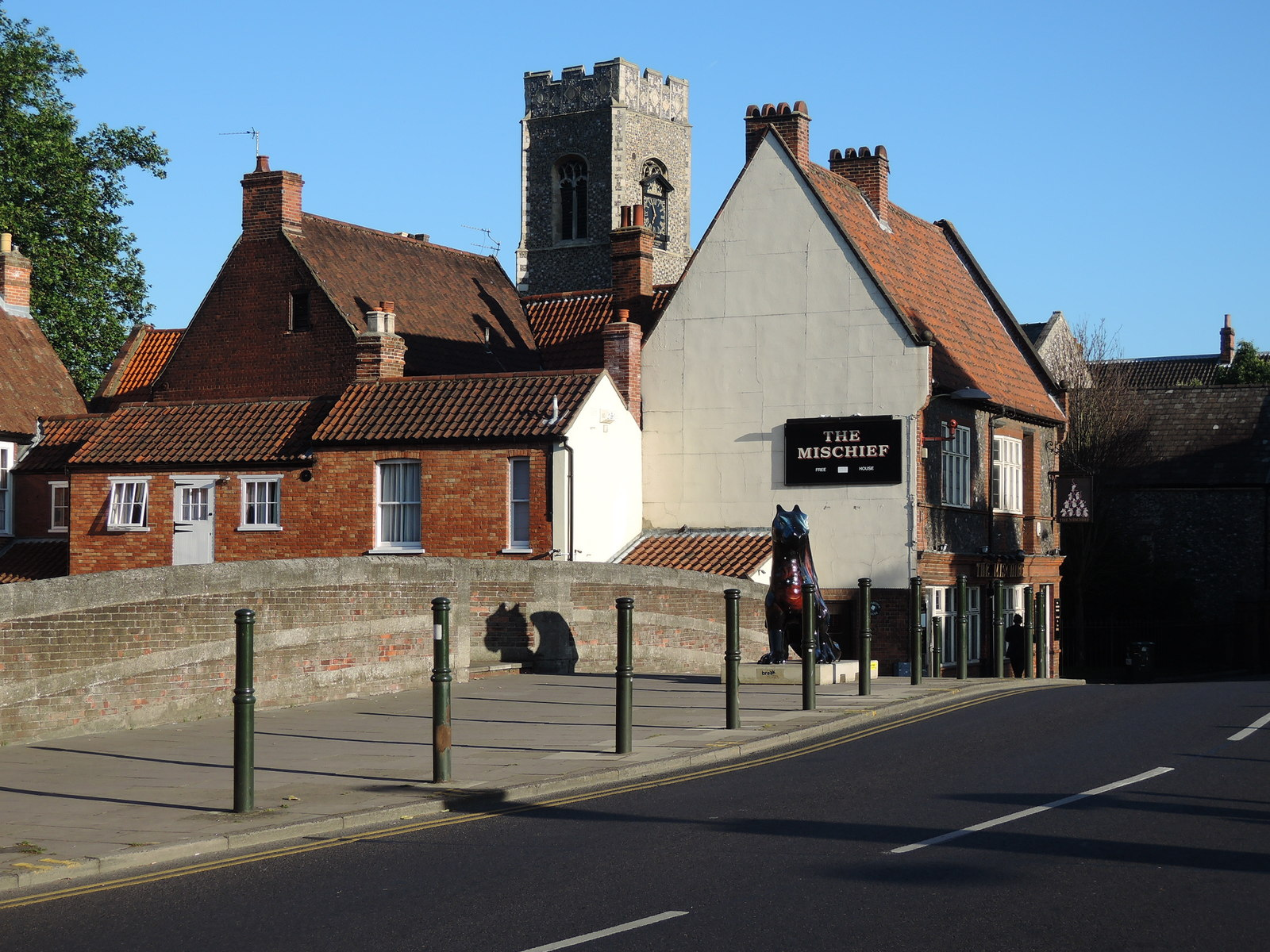
The church tower behind buildings (including The Mischief) from Fye Bridge

Urban settlement was present in the general area of the church from the 9th century onward. Urban space may have been cleared for the building. St Clement Colegate is placed at a crossroads formed by Fye Bridge (first constructed in the third quarter of the 10th century), between Fyebridge Street, Colegate and Fishergate. Fye Bridge, which is nearby, is the only likely pre-Norman bridge in Norwich; it carries a major historic axis of the city, King Street and Magdalen Street, north to south. The church 'guarded' this bridge to the city, controlling access from Tombland into the northern defensive burh, the bridge being a link between the two D-shaped defended enclosures of the city that existed before the Norman Conquest. The church is surrounded on all four sides by footways, making it an 'island' site, common for important churches of Anglo-Saxon foundation. These footways are Fyebridge Street to the east, Colegate to the north, and small lanes on the west and south. The space around the church is constrained. Its churchyard is 0.32 acres (0.13 ha), relatively small.

== Parish ==
Parish records show that other churches in the city paid tithes to the parish of St Clement Colegate; it was an important parish and may have been a minster, from which the other parishes were carved. The parochial community appears to have been vibrant, with lay parishioners having an increased influence on the church from the 1520s onward. In 1676, the parish had the largest percentage of religious nonconformists in Norwich, possibly due to its location near to the Presbyterian and Independent Meeting Houses. It was home to many inhabitants who were part of the weaving industry. In 1901, St Clement's parish had a zymotic death rate at 8.3/1000, higher than the city average of 2.7/1000 at the time.

=== Boundaries ===
The boundaries of the parish of St Clement Colegate were the most extensive and complex in the city, with multiple detached areas.

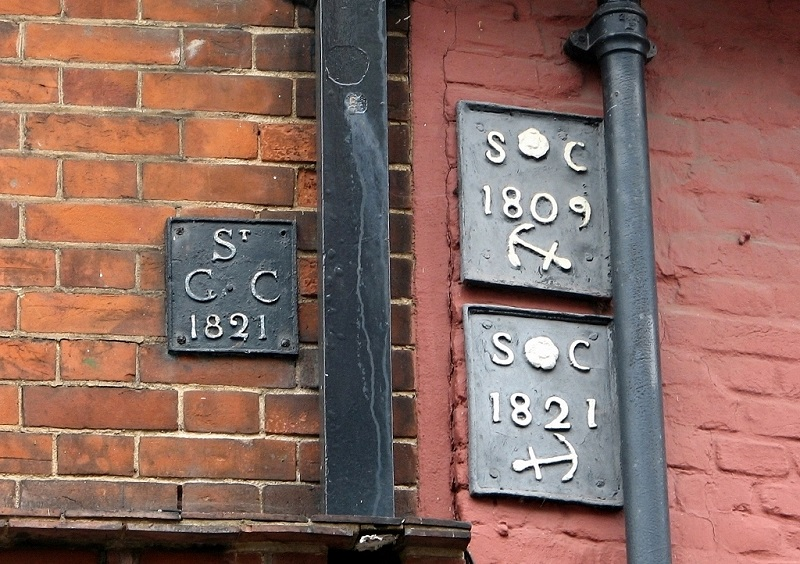
19th-century parish boundary markers distinguishing the parishes of St George Colegate (left) and St Clement Colegate (right), the latter featuring anchor symbols representing St Clement.

One part of the parish was the immediate vicinity of the church, with the boundary following the river Wensum to the south and the outflow of the Muspole to the south-west. It only extended three tenements to the east along Fishergate, but between 1285 and 1340 this street was bounded on both sides by properties belonging to Waltham Abbey in the parish of St Edmund. The northern boundary of this part of the parish was around 60 metres (66 yd) north of Colegate, and the section of its western boundary north of Colegate was located around 40 metres (44 yd) from the churchyard, forming a sub-ward boundary.

Another part of the parish was a detached piece of land which covered much of Gildencroft within the city walls; the tithes of the Gildencroft during this time were split three ways between St Clement's, St Augustine's, and St Martin at Oak, possibly by the Gisney lords of the manor. The medieval hundred court for Taverham was held on this part of the Gildencroft due to the manor being distinct and being an extra-urban entity. There were no noted properties in this section of the parish, and the tax on land levied by the city known as langdable was not collected from this area; it was either open land or only lightly developed. The east boundary to this section, with the parish of St Martin at Oak, was formed by the southern side of an intramural lane between Oak Street and St Augustine's Street.

Another detached part of the parish consisted of two properties, acquired by shoemaker and gaiter maker John of Poringland in 1285 and 1286, that were recorded as part of the parish in the 1280s, despite being surrounded by other properties that were part of the parish of St George Colegate.

There was another detached piece of land outside the walls as far as Mile Cross. This was a large portion of the parish, which in 1841 became the parish of Christchurch New Catton.

The garden of the old Dominican friary site was historically in the parish, though later became part of St John Colegate and St Mary in Combusto.
