= St Mary in the Marsh, Norwich =

Lost church in Norwich, England

St Mary in the Marsh
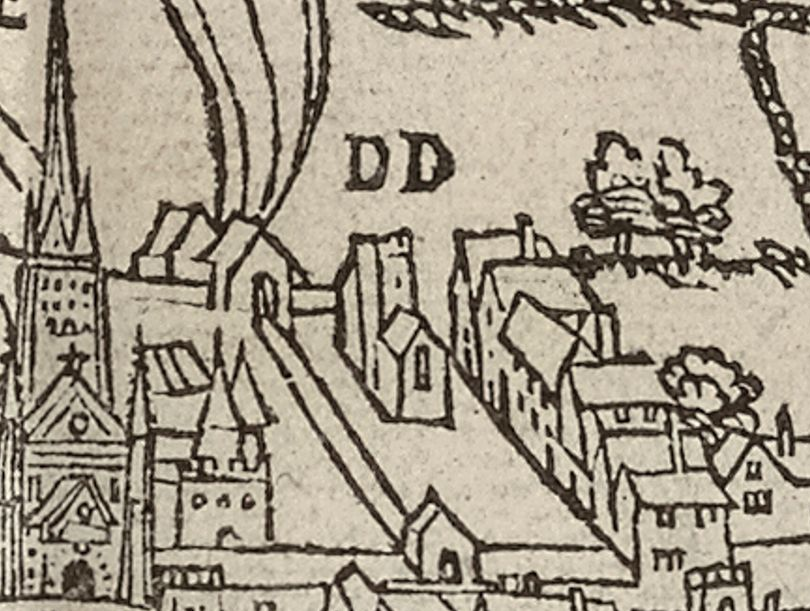
- St Mary in the Marsh, as depicted (perhaps inaccurately) on the Cuningham Prospect in 1558, across from Norwich Cathedral (left).
- St Mary in the Marsh
- 52°37′50″N 1°18′07″E
- OS grid reference: TG 23559 08762
- Location: Norwich, Norfolk
- Country: England

History
- Dedication: Mary, mother of Jesus

Architecture
- Closed: 1564
- Demolished: 1775

St Mary in the Marsh is a parish in Norwich in Norfolk, England, dedicated to Mary the Virgin and formerly of a church of the same name. Founded prior to the Norman Conquest, the likely round-tower church was absorbed within the walls of the Norwich Cathedral close between 1250 and 1265, though retained its status as a parish church. In 1564, due to high upkeep costs, the church was closed, and since that year the parish has operated without a church. The parishes of St Vedast and St Peter Parmentergate were amalgamated into the parish, and the church was gutted and converted into tenements. In 1775, a Georgian terrace was built on the site, though the interior walls of the building retain some remains of the church walls and foundations. The parish has been, since the 16th century, based in St Luke's Chapel of Norwich Cathedral, where the church's original font remains, as well as the Despenser Reredos.

== History ==
Two Anglo-Saxon wills document the presence of St Mary in the Marsh before the Norman Conquest. This includes the undated Old English will of Sifflaed, involving cattle. The Norwich Cathedral Register, dated to around 1300, confirms that St Mary in the Marsh was founded long before the Norman Conquest.

The church was known in Latin as Sancte Maria in (de) marisco in the 12th century; this was a dedication to Mary the Virgin, one of 196 such dedications in Norfolk. Its suffix of (de) marisco or 'in the marsh' derives from the low-lying marshland location of the church which would have needed drainage. The control of the church by the cathedral priory was acknowledged in an 1154 papal bull, and an 1157 charter from Henry II confirmed the past gifts and liberties that related to the church of sancte Marie de marisco.

=== 1250–1564: Absorption into the Norwich Cathedral precinct ===
Between 1250 and 1265, St Mary in the Marsh became one of the pre-Conquest churches to be absorbed within the walls of the close around the cathedral, also known as its precinct. It became one of four churches within this newly enclosed area, though from the cathedral was located behind another wall. It, along with two of the other churches enclosed into the precinct (St Ethelbert's and St Helen's), retained its right of burial as a parish church. Its enclosure brought administrative problems. In 1272, there was a significant transfer of rights and parishioners in favour of the cathedral priory, overseen by Bishop Scarning. When the church of St Ethelbert was burnt the same year, St Mary's was the only church in the cathedral close left standing. St Ethelbert's parish was merged into that of St Mary's. By this time, the church was a rectory.

In the final quarter of the 13th century, almonry boys of the cathedral would, after the end of Sunday Mass, go to St Mary in the Marsh to sing the chant at divine service, which involved intoning the psalms. Joan Greatrex has put forward that this musical involvement may have been the earliest indication of the existence of a rudimentary song school.

Through the Middle Ages, the church continued to receive tithes from secular people who lived in the cathedral precinct. John de Dodelington, rector in 1324, acquired land in 1329 and a messuage in 1331, both immediately south of the churchyard, and then transferred them to the cathedral prior, William de Clayton, in the latter year. In 1378, the church was recorded as Sancte Maria del Merssh. Whereas the wealthiest lay people sought burial in the cathedral church, servants of the priory were likely to be buried at St Mary in the Marsh. In the 15th and 16th centuries, burials at the church are recorded. The church appears on Cuningham's plan of Norwich in 1558, though its precise form here cannot be made out. In 1559, the final rector of St Mary in the Marsh, John Toller, was appointed.

=== 1564–1775: Closure, gutting, and conversion into tenements ===
In 1564, the dean and chapter made the decision to close the church because the cost of its upkeep was too great. From this year until the present day, the parish has operated without a church, which is a unique occurrence in Norfolk. The churchyard, buildings, bells, and lead of the church were initially reserved for the dean and chapter. The dean removed the lead roof, worth £160 once sold, though 18th-century antiquary Francis Blomefield later stated that "it was sworn in 1568, that he never brought one penny of it into account". After this, the dean and chapter sold the rest of the building to the chancellor of the diocese for £80. The chancellor gutted the church's interior and a large amount of its stonework. Its bells were sold. St Luke's chapel in the cathedral housed the font from St Mary's and it resides there today. Blomefield later expressed disapproval of the gutting; he wrote, "the Bishop assuming a strange and unwarrantable power of desecrating the said church; an example I never met with in any age before, or since; and not only so, but of converting the structure itself to the use of the cathedral".

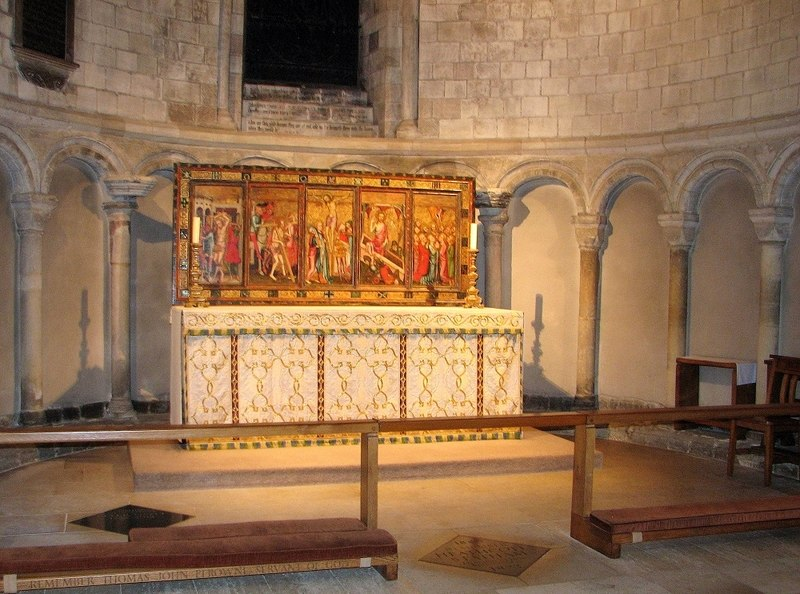
From the 1590s, St Mary's parish operated from St Luke's Chapel in the south ambulatory of the cathedral

Also in 1564, the parishes of St Vedast, St Peter Parmentergate, and St Mary were amalgamated into a singular parish. The church's congregation moved to worship in the south nave aisle of the cathedral, this being renamed from the chapel of St John the Baptist to the chapel of St Mary and St John, where income from St Mary's rectory and parsonage was sent. The congregation later moved to the bishop's chapel, and then, around 30 years after the original church was closed, St Luke's chapel, in the Cathedral's south ambulatory, which the parish has used ever since. They adopted the cloister garth of the cathedral for their burials.

The church building did not yet see demolition, instead standing for some time and then being turned into a dwelling house. By 1564, the church had been converted and was leased as two separate properties. That year, the earliest minute book of the dean and chapter referred to the "late dissolved parish church of Sanct Maryes in ye Maryesehe".

The remains of the church appear to have survived into the 18th century; a plan from between 1761 and 1775 shows what appears to be an outline of the church. On this plan, the former churchyard is divided into small tenements on a property with the name Gascoin and Lines. Spinsters Ann and Rachel Brigham had leased land to the north and south of the church, and the remaining period of the lease was purchased by chancellor of the diocese George Sandby who also owned properties such as stables, shops, tenements, and a public house. Some of these properties were next to the churchyard.

=== 1775–present: Numbers 10 and 12 The Close ===
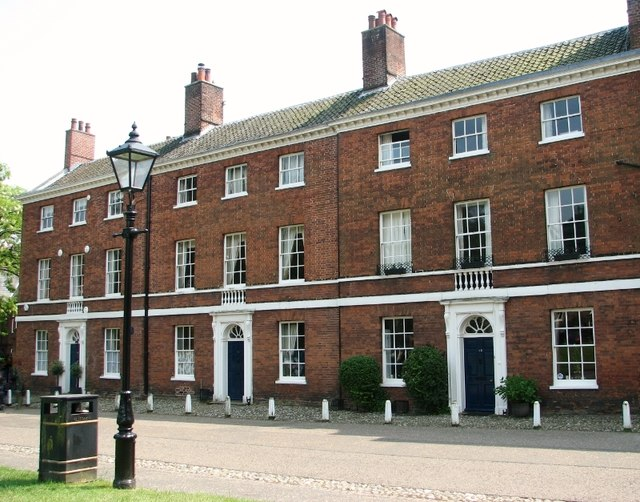
Numbers 10 and 12 The Close (St Mary's Chant) retain the north wall of St Mary's in the Marsh as a central spinal wall.

A new terraced house was built on the site of the church in 1775. The building is located on a street named "The Close" and the address is 10 and 12 The Close. This terrace, built by Stephen Moore in a Georgian style and for a time known as St Mary's Chant, is present today. It reuses the north wall of the church as its central spinal wall. Additionally, the wall inside Number 12 features two 16th-century windows from the church.

Portions of the church still remain within numbers 10 and 12 The Close; this may amount to a large part of the original church building. This building is now internally divided and is clad with Georgian brick. The church's parish still exists and functions without a church, remaining in St Luke's Chapel, where the Despenser Reredos also resides.

== Architecture ==
The 1760 or 1761 outline of the church, which is rectangular in shape, shows it with a nave, chancel, south porch. This outline also suggests it was a round-towered church with this tower being on the west side. The west porch adjoining the tower is narrow, and a buttressed transept or chapel appears to extend from the south wall.

=== Church remains ===
Present inside number 12 The Close, there remains a tall wall running north–south which is coursed and covered in limewash. It has a visible height of 4.3 metres (14 ft) and a visible length of 7 metres (23 ft). A capital with an eroded head and animals is in the southern end, and another carved yet eroded head is present in the wall further north. There are flint walls in the cellar that extend 6 metres (20 ft) north and south. They have no visible ashlar, and are much thicker than others in the building. The north side of a stair to its cellar has an blocked window with transom and lozenge mullions which is about 2.14 metres (7.0 ft) wide. This is from the 16th century, and possibly includes the eastern reveal of an earlier window that may be from the church. At ground floor level, there is a blocked 16th-century window, which can be seen from the present cellar stairs.

== Font ==
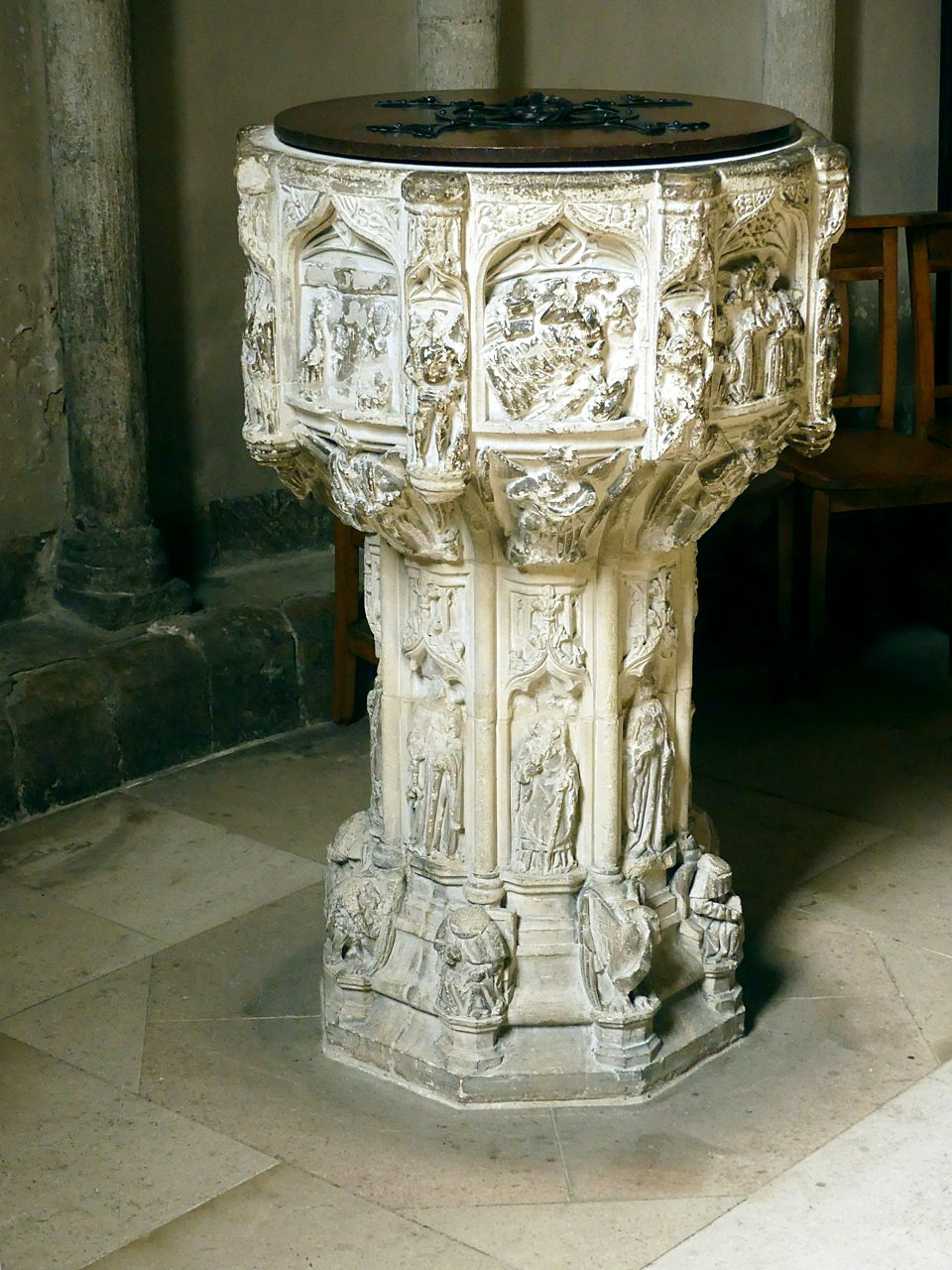
Norwich Cathedral's Chapel of St Luke now houses the font from St Mary in the Marsh.

The font from St Mary in the Marsh survives, and is now in Norwich Cathedral, in the Chapel of St Luke. It may date from the 15th century, and its creation was possibly a response to the Lollards who opposed much of what it depicts. It is somewhat damaged, and is of limestone, possibly clunch. The base has alternating seated figures of the four doctors of the Church and evangelist symbols. On the stem, there are standing saints in niches. There are eight demi-angels that have their wings outstretched and which support the basin. Though the basin is cylindrical, there are eight more angels which stand upright on its corners, and these bracket scenes of the sacraments on the sides; of the eight Norwich medieval fonts with figural decoration that have survived, it is the only one to depict the Seven Sacraments. Ayers et al. have argued that it may be the earliest of all Sacrament fonts. It also depicts the Crucifixion. Each depiction is under a fictive vaulted canopy.

== Location ==
Ground levels were around 2.7 metres (8.9 ft) below the present surface when the church was built. It was adjacent to a pasture named Cowholme. Based on mapped reconstructions of the road pattern prior to the cathedral, there was possibly a north–south road which ran from the river crossing at Whitefriars Bridge, south past St Martin at Palace and the possible site of Holy Trinity, to St Mary in the Marsh, then to St Vedast. There may have been an eastern projection of Queen Street which may have crossed Tombland and gone toward the river, likely intersecting with the north–south road near St Mary's.

Once the cathedral was present, the church site was to the south of the cathedral's Lower Close. The southern precinct wall likely formed a dogleg around the churchyard. This churchyard was a large area of about 2,000 square metres (2,400 sq yd). Post-medieval leases refer to parts of the churchyard on both its north and south sides as well as to 'the church stile'.

=== Parish ===
The parish of St Mary's shared the cathedral precinct with that of St Ethelbert's and St Helen's parishes. Part of St Mary's parish extended south of the cathedral close to St Faith's Lane (formerly Horsefair). It was likely bounded by the Dallingfleet stream. It might have included Ratonrowe, an area outside the priory gates, though jurisdiction in this area was disputed. Bounding the parish on its east was the River Wensum, and it initially met the boundaries of St Helen's and Holy Trinity to the north though was later extended on this side to the precinct wall. St Peter Parmentergate's parish joined with St Mary's in 1564.

== Sources ==
- Gilchrist, Roberta (2005). Norwich Cathedral Close The Evolution of the English Cathedral Landscape. Studies in the History of Medieval Religion. Boydell & Brewer. ISBN 978-1-78327-096-5.
- Gillette, Amy; Stewart, Zachary, eds. (3 October 2023). The Baptismal Font Canopy of St. Peter Mancroft, Norwich. Brill Publishing. doi:10.1163/9789004680579. ISBN 978-90-04-68057-9.
