= All Saints Westlegate =

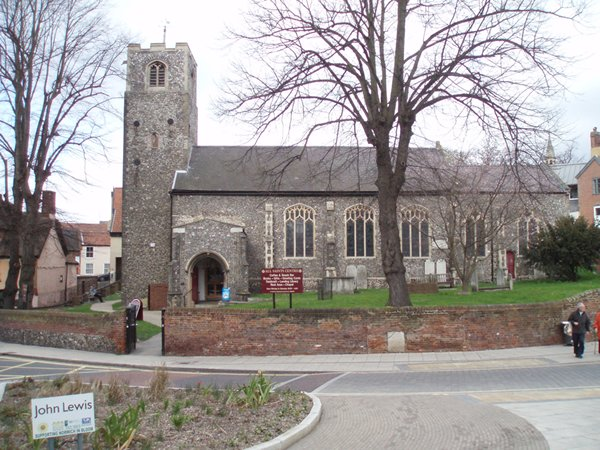
- All Saints Westlegate in 2007
- All Saints Westlegate
- 52°37′33.67″N 1°17′44.87″E
- OS grid reference: TG 23144 08229
- Location: Norwich, Norfolk
- Country: England
- Denomination: Church of England

History
- Status: Redundant
- Dedication: Feast of All Saints

Architecture
- Functional status: Chapel
- Heritage designation: Grade I listed
- Closed: 1973

All Saints Westlegate, also known as All Saints Berstreet, is a Grade I listed redundant parish church in Norwich in Norfolk, England. It one of two churches dedicated to the feast of All Saints in Norwich, the other being the now-lost All Saints Fyebriggate, and is one of the five ringing towers in the city.

== History ==
There is little documentary evidence of the foundation of the church. An All Saints church saw mention in the Domesday Book in 1166, though this could have either been this church, or the other Norwich All Saints church located in Magdalen Street.

There is an anchorhold attached to the church that served religious hermits who chose to live their life separate from secular society. The city records from 1287 to 1288 show that servants of the anchoress were charged with ‘stopping up the cockey (blocked the common drain) so that no one can pass by there’. It has been suggested that this was done in an attempt to cover up that either the anchoress or her servants were engaged in trade, something that was forbidden for any anchoress.

In 1954, the church became a Grade I listed building.

=== Redundancy ===
On being made redundant in 1973, Norwich Historic Churches Trust took All Saints over and immediately spent £8000 on making it watertight. In 1982, several burials in the church were disturbed by workers who attempting to lay central heating pipes in the church. From 1979 it housed the All Saints Centre, a community centre set up by Jo Cook. It was used as a place to serve the community and to provide Christian hospitality for the less advantaged. The church was improved during this tenancy to include a commercial standard kitchen and a first-floor room in the aisle. This was originally designed to house the Diocesan Mothers' Union. The church faced an arson attack in 1992, following which there was a large cleaning and redecoration. In 2001, a late Saxon or early medieval body sherd of sandwich ware was recovered in a repair trench in the church. The Diocesan Mothers' Union moved out in 2003. The All Saints Centre closed in 2015, when it was reopened as an antiques centre and tea room.

The church is one of the five ringing towers in the city. The Norwich Diocesan Association of Ringers use this as one of their churches on the first Tuesday of every month. On 29 November 2023, a peal with the method Cambridge Surprise Minor, conducted by David Brown, was rung in the church to commemorate the 50th anniversary of its closure. The chancel remains a consecrated chapel.

== Architecture ==
The church is made of flint and stone, and has brick dressings and plain tile roofs. It has a nave, chancel, north aisle, south porch, and an un-buttressed square west tower. The present chancel dates back to the 13th century, though as a result of an extensive remodelling in the late middle ages, the rest of the church was largely built in the 15th century when the nave and north aisle were added.

The chancel arch was enlarged inside the church in the 15th century. It is a little off-centre. The chancel, of two bays, has two-light early 15th-century windows featuring reticulated tracery, and also has a three-light large east window which is in the Decorated style. It appears 14th century but is actually Victorian.

In the 15th century, the north wall of the church's interior was replaced by an arcade of four-centred arches, which feature heavy octagonal arcade piers. These open into a new north aisle, which is present today, and the south wall was remodelled with arches. The roof interior is made up of open trusses, as well as one butt-purlin, and curved braces which come from wall posts which alternate between being low or high depending on the arcade arches. Outside, the church's porch overlaps the nave plinth, so was likely a later addition. It was once taller, and there is rougher masonry on its roof where the upper section was removed. There was once a stair turret to the parvise on the west side of the porch, beside the last nave buttress on the south wall, evidenced by rough areas where the porch meets the nave as well as an exposed area of flint foundation.

The un-buttressed tower is very plain. It was also built in the 15th century, with the tower arch inside the church being enlarged at that time. Extensive repair work was done in the 19th century, with its corners being rebuilt in brick. The top stage of the tower was rebuilt in 1913. There are six bells in the tower. One bell, formerly near the tower screen, was cast by John Brend II in 1647. By 2023, this bell had been moved to St Martin at Palace Plain for display. Brend's foundry was located nearby the church, and he was buried at the church.

== Furnishings ==
From the 1860s to 1973, the church had high Anglican furnishings. It had 18th century box pews which were converted into open benches in 1887, then replaced by chairs in 1929. An elaborate reredos was next to a representation of the Virgin and Child in the window above the high altar; this glass is now at St John Timberhill. There was another representation of the Madonna in a statue to the right of the chancel arch. There was a rood beam with a cross on it, and choir stalls in the chancel with a side altar and organ in the north aisle. This organ dates from 1861 and was by Corps. It also used to house a carved font. This featured carvings of saints arranged around the bowl and base. It was moved to St Julian's, following All Saints' being made redundant in the parochial reorganisation in 1973.

All furnishings were removed from the church, and there is now an enclosed meeting room with a gallery in the north aisle, as well as a kitchen, servery, and office space. Another gallery originally from St Saviour's provides a platform for bell ringers. Glazed doors were installed, and access is now provided for those with disabilities. The altar table remains in the chancel.
