= All Saints Fyebriggate =

Demolished church in Norwich, England

- All Saints Fyebriggate
- 52°38′13″N 1°17′49″E
- OS grid reference: TG 2318 0944
- Location: Norwich, Norfolk
- Country: England

History
- Status: Demolished
- Dedication: All Saints

Architecture
- Demolished: 1551

All Saints Fyebriggate was a medieval parish church in the city of Norwich in Norfolk, England. Though possibly mentioned in the 1166 Domesday Book, this mention may have referred to All Saints Westlegate instead. The first confirmed documentary mention of All Saints Fyebriggate took place in 1211. Badly damaged by a major fire in the early 16th century, the church was demolished after being sold to Norwich's mayor and citizens in March 1551.

== History ==
An All Saints church in Norwich is mentioned in the Domesday Book of 1166. While Carole Rawcliffe and Richard Wilson state that this likely referred to All Saints Fyebriggate, Brian Ayers et al argue that the mention was instead of the other All Saints in Norwich; All Saints Westlegate, which is on Ber Street and south of the city's river. Hubert fitz Ralph, the church's lay donor, possibly transferred the church between 1205 and 1211 as it does not appear in the 1205 Bishop of Norwich's charter. Hubert was listed as a patron of both St Margaret in combusto and All Saints when giving St Margaret's to the priory. However, All Saints does appear in Bishop John de Grey's 1211 confirmation charter to Norwich Cathedral priory, making it one of several held by the priory by this time. This latter charter is the first confirmed mention of All Saints Fyebriggate. It was not recorded in the 1254 Norwich Taxation, being of too little value.

In 1368, the church shared its ornaments with St Saviour's, being treated together in the archdeacon's inventory that year. By this time, All Saints also had the same chaplain as St Saviour's and St Margaret's and they shared vestments, plate, and service books. Appropriated by the almoner, the three churches were being administered together by the late 14th century. The stipendiary priest lived in a residence owned by the almoner which was north of All Saints. St Margaret's parish was united into All Saints' parish in the 15th century. From around 1490, the church saw separate administration under Robert Wakerle for seven years with a rent of 2s, before its lease changed hands to Nicholas Tobry for a further seven years, the rent having increased significantly to 13s 4d. Tobry would later flee with half of the year's income after falling into arrears. Rent was reduced to 6s 8d after this, though this was still around double the expected revenue.

The church recorded severe fire damage in 1508; there had been major fires in the city. £4 was spent on rebuilding the chancel as recorded in a 1519 indenture, and there were more payments attributed to reeding its roof and glazing its windows. By the 1530s, the church had no income. In March 1551, the church was leased by the Norwich Cathedral dean and chapter to the mayor and citizens of Norwich for a duration of 500 years; this was later recorded by Francis Blomefield. Later, in May, The dean lied to the parishioners that the church had not been given or sold. In June, the parish of All Saints was united into the parish of St Paul, and the church was subsequently demolished. The materials for the church and the churchyard were sold; Blomefield wrote that of the dean and chapter and the city, "the one swallowed the revenues, parsonage-house, etc. and got rid of the serving curate's stipend; and the other got the bells, lead, plate, etc. for a trifling sum [...]".

== Location and parish ==
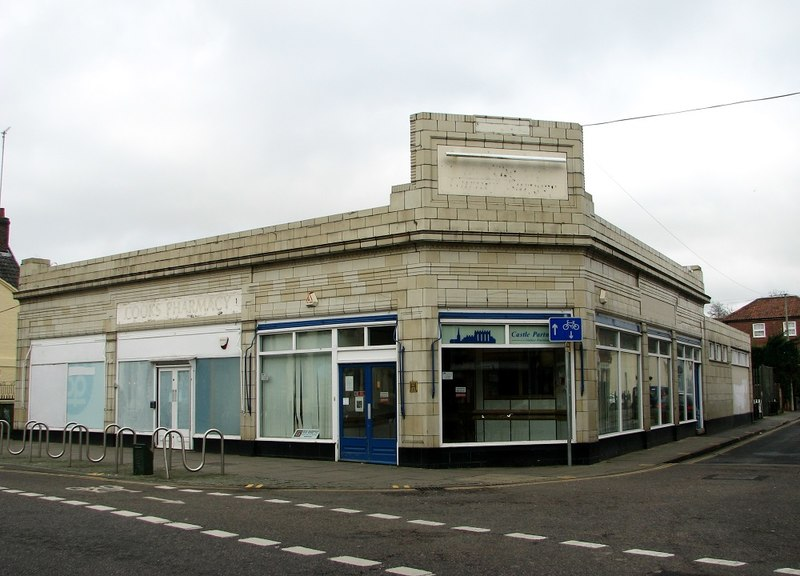
A modern building now takes up the former site of All Saints Fyebriggate

Located at a junction, on the west of Magdalen Street and on the north of Cowgate, It stood where Magdalen Street passed through an Anglo-Scandinavian earthwork enclosure, acting as a 'gate guardian' though separated from the earthwork by an intramural road. A modern building now stands on the site, and it is possible that the east wall of this building is located where the church's chancel arch would have been, and the chancel would have stood in the car park next to the building. It is also possible that this area was instead an adjacent garden. The parish was bounded by those of St Botolf, St Margaret in combusto, St James Pockthorpe and St Paul.
