= St Margaret Fyebriggate =

Demolished church in Norwich, England

- St Margaret in combusto
- St Margaret Fyebriggate
- 52°38′18″N 1°17′47″E
- OS grid reference: TG 23141 09598
- Location: Norwich, Norfolk
- Country: England

History
- Status: Demolished
- Dedication: Margaret the Virgin

Architecture
- Demolished: 1547

Specifications
- Length: 17.5 metres (57 ft)
- Width: 50 metres (160 ft)

St Margaret Fyebriggate, also known as St Margaret in combusto, or St Margaret Combust, was a parish church in the city of Norwich in Norfolk, England. The farthest north within Norwich's medieval city walls and nearby Magdalen Gate, it was located on the western side of Magdalen Street. Following its foundation likely in the 12th century, it is most noted for the use of its graveyard for the burial of executed criminals from as early as its first appearance in records in the mid-13th century until the mid-15th century. The church was possibly in disuse by 1492, and it was partially demolished in 1547.

An institution for blind people likely demolished the church's remains when building onto the site in the early 19th century. The site underwent a series of archaeological excavations from 1973 until 1987, when the location of the church was rediscovered and 431 articulated skeletons and 600 disarticulated or semi-articulated skeletons were removed from the former graveyard. Throckmorton Yard now occupies the site.

== History ==
The church was likely founded after the Norman Conquest. Brian Ayers argues that the parish had been founded at least a century prior to the mid-13th century, and likely longer. There was a push of urban development in the area from c. 1100. Recovered material from the building's structure date from the late 12th to 14th century, though it may have been preceded by a wooden structure. A 12th-century date matches the foundations some of the other churches in the leet of Ultra Aquam.

Around 1205–10 in return for confraternity, Hubert son of Ranulf (Ringulf) granted the church, alongside All Saints Fyebriggate, to Norwich Cathedral Priory. In the charter, Hubert named himself as patron of both churches, which are also both named in Bishop John de Grey's 1211 confirmation charter. St Margaret's church was first allocated by this bishop 'at the appropriation' to the cathedral's almonry and subsequently to the infirmary. The church was recorded in the Valuation of Norwich between 1254 and 1275, though does not appear in the assessments of 1254 and 1291 as it was likely too poor. By the 14th century, it had the status of a rectory, being valued as such in 1368 at one mark (13s 4d); a low valuation that was similar to that of seven others of the 14 churches and one chapel in Norwich's northern ward.

In about 1468, the church's parish appears to have been united with that of All Saints Fyebriggate. Bishop Goldwell's Visitation of 1492 does not mention the church; it may have been in disuse at this point. By 1500 the church's parish had amalgamated with that of another. In 1521, the church had a pious confraternity that was dedicated to Saint Margaret. The church was demolished to some extent in 1547, when its parish was united with that of St Paul's. It was to some extent still standing, however, in 1672; there was mention of a house and grounds known as "the Chapell of Sct Margarette". When large cellars of the early 19th-century institution for blind people, the Blind Institute, were constructed, they probably demolished the remains of the church in the process. The site is now occupied by Throckmorton Yard.

=== Graveyard ===
From as early as the mid-13th century, executed criminals were being buried in the church's graveyard. This may relate to the gallows that stood just outside the nearby Magdalen Gate and within the parish of the church, likely somewhat near present-day Churchill Road. The hanged criminals were buried here in pits, without ceremony. The cemetery fell out of use possibly a few years after the mid-15th century, likely by 1468.

== Dedication and naming ==
St Margaret Fyebriggate had a dedication to Margaret of Antioch. there were two other churches with this dedication in the city; St Margaret Newbridge which also resided in the leet of Ultra Aquam, and St Margaret Westwick. The dedication may relate to the notion of rescuing the souls of the criminals who were buried there from demons.

The church was known in its earliest documented reference, between 1254 and 1275, as Sancta Margareta ubi sepeliunter suspensi ('St Margaret where those who have been hanged are buried'). Aside from Fybriggate or Fyebriggate, the church has had several further suffixes, including 'In Fybridge', 'by the Gates', and 'in combusto'. The suffix of in combusto, meaning 'in the burnt area', was also given to the church of St Mary in combusto which was also located in Ultra Aquam. It has also been referred to as St Margaret Combust. This refers to a significant fire in the area which occurred at some point before 1223, with an unknown exact date. This may have been the sacking of Norwich by Swein Forkbeard, though this theory is unproven as there was little present that could have been burned at that time.

== Location ==
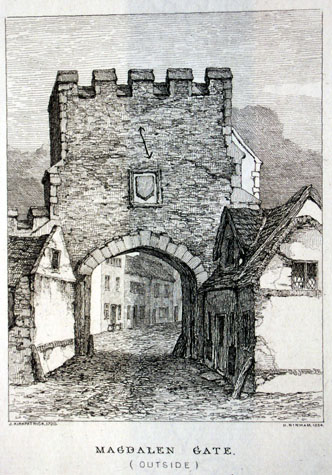
The church was nearby Magdalen Gate, outside which there was a gallows

St Margaret Fyebriggate stood on the northern end of Magdalen Street, on its west side. It stood outside the original boundary ditch of the Anglo-Scandinavian town, though became the most northerly church within the medieval walled city of Norwich following their construction in c. 1300, being around 91 metres (100 yd) south of the city wall, close to the wall's Magdalen Gate. It was nearly 1 kilometre (0.62 mi) north of the River Wensum, and 1.5 kilometres (0.93 mi) from the city market. The site of the church was depicted on the 1885 Ordnance Survey maps behind buildings on 136 Magdalen Street, however a 1973 excavation found that it and much of its graveyard was actually located behind 132 Magdalen Street. The area in which it resided was poor.

Its site was likely outside Norwich's urban area until the very late 11th or early 12th century, and it probably remained peripheral to the urban area for some time as in the 16th and 17th centuries there were references to barns, stables, orchards and gardens.

=== Parish ===
The parish of St Margaret Fyebriggate likely extended north beyond the city walls. Its original southern extent on the west side of Magdalen Street was only a tenement or so from the churchyard, and on the east it was around halfway between St Margaret's and All Saints. Its full east and west extents are unclear. The parish became part of All Saints Fyebriggate's parish after 1453 and in turn being absorbed by St Paul's parish in 1550/1.

== Architecture ==
Little is known about the church's architecture, though it measured at approximately 17.5 metres (57 ft) by 50 metres (160 ft), taking up just over a fifth of an acre.

== Archaeology ==
=== Excavations ===
There was an excavation of the site by J. P. Roberts for the Norwich Survey in 1973, which was limited to the street frontage, as well as to an area to the rear of 132 to 134 Magdalen Street. The excavation mostly focused on recording the standing buildings, in anticipation of intended redevelopment which eventually took place in 1988. Burials were located but no evidence of the church itself was found.

Another excavation took place from 30 September 1985 in anticipation of a new residential and commercial development proposed by Norwich City Council, which the Norfolk Archaeological Unit dug three machine-cut trenches to determine the extent of the burials to the rear of 132 Magdalen Street. They found skeletal material in all three trenches, likely the graveyard of the church.

Further archaeological work, prompted by the Home Office requirement to remove all burials from a site prior to its redevelopment, was undertaken from late January to mid-May 1987. With its principal aims to remove and record the burials, analyse the retrieved skeletal material, define the graveyard's extent and obtain a plan of the church, It excavated a 40-by-22-metre (44 by 24 yd) area. It uncovered the base of the east wall of St Margaret's, thus locating the exact church site, and also finding several pieces of dressed limestone from the original church in a cellar wall in the street frontage. It found 431 articulated skeletons, many in "irregular positions" for example in groups with some individuals prone and/or facing west; very few of these were infants. There were also 600 disarticulated or semi-articulated skeletons. It found five mortar-lined graves, and one chalk-lined grave.

=== Analysis of human skeletal material ===
In total, 436 burials were excavated from the church, with 413 of them being analysed in detail. 76.9% of the 368 sexable individuals, were found to be male, and 18.2% female. Of the 413, 10.9% were below twelve years of age, and there was a high frequency of young adult males. The age distribution suggests there was a high frequency of criminals or at least hanged males. There were ten individuals with cranial wounds, ten of which likely being caused by weapons such as swords. There was a presence of lepromatous and tuberculoid leprosy in seven individuals, as well as six cases of treponemal disease, the latter finding being unique in the British Isles and likely in Europe as of 2009. Twelve burials had evidence of burning, though there was no discernible pattern. There were two disabled individuals who survived into adulthood, suggesting that despite their poverty, the community in the parish of St Margaret Fyebriggate was caring and supportive of those with disabilities.

== Sources ==
- Stirland, Ann (2009). Criminals and Paupers: the Graveyard of St Margaret Fyebriggate in combusto, Norwich. East Anglian Archaeology. Dereham, Norfolk: Script Books. ISBN 978-0-905594-47-7.
