= St Mary Unbrent =

Lost church in Norwich, England

- St Mary in Combusto
- St Mary Unbrent
- 52°38′04″N 1°17′47″E
- OS grid reference: TG 23148 09173
- Location: Norwich, Norfolk
- Country: England

History
- Status: Lost
- Dedication: Mary, mother of Jesus

Architecture
- Demolished: Before 1558

St Mary Unbrent, also known as St Mary in Combusto, was a church in the city of Norwich in Norfolk, England. Possibly founded around 900 AD, its suffixes 'unbrent' and 'combusto' denote its association with a fire early in its history. After a string of rectors and somewhat increasing wealth into the 14th century, poverty in the area led to the church closing and being demolished before 1558 and its parish was merged into that of the neighbouring St Saviour's. Golden Dog Lane, likely an original footpath of the St Mary's churchyard, remains.

== History ==
St Mary's was likely founded early in the city's history; Ayers et al have suggested a date of around AD 900. The church may have fallen victim to the sacking of Norwich in 1004 by Swein Forkbeard. The first documentary reference to the church is in a 1223 Norwich public deed. Its patronage initially remained proprietary, and was not given to the Norwich Cathedral priory, unlike over half of the Norwich churches north of the river Wensum by 1248.

Following the granting of its advowson by Matthew le Brun prior to that year, the church laid in the gift of the college of St Mary in the Fields. This was part of the foundation established by Matthew's brother John le Brun, and the gift made St Mary Unbrent the last church in Norwich to be handed to a religious foundation. In 1254, the church was too poor to be recorded in that year's Taxation, nor in 1291. Ralph de Newton was rector in 1263, and Robert de Sempringham had this role in 1309 according to Francis Blomefield.

In 1368, the church's value was given as £1; this was higher than the other churches on Magdalen Street aside from All Saints' and St Clement Colegate. In 1492, the year Bishop Goldwell visited the church, John Owdolf or Oudolff was rector of St Mary's as well as parish chaplain of the neighbouring St Saviour's parish.

=== Redundancy and demolition ===
In 1508, a debate arose over whether St Saviour's of St Mary's should be closed, likely due to issues sustaining multiple parishes in a state of poverty. This lasted until the Reformation, when it was decided that St Saviour's, which belonged to the cathedral priory, should stay operational; "the whole was granted to the dean and chapter". The church and its yard were granted to the grocer Nicholas Sotherton. He closed St Mary's and demolished it, and its parish was united with that of St Saviour's. This likely took place before 1558, when Sotherton conveyed a footpath through the north side of the churchyard to the city, which is now known as Golden Dog Lane.

== Dedication and naming ==
The church was dedicated to the Virgin Mary.

The first known reference to the church in 1223 calls its parish that of Sancte Maria Arse, and later names, both in circa 1250, included (ecclesia) Sante Marie Combuste and (in cimiterio) Beate Marie uirginis combuste. The suffixes arse and combuste both mean 'burnt', likely referring to a fire in the area. This may have been the sacking of Norwich in 1004 by Swein Forkbeard, as this church would have been in the area affected at that time. A similar suffix was used for St Margaret Combust, a church that was also in the area affected. The suffix may instead refer to a great fire that took place during William the Conqueror's reign. The later used suffix 'unbrent', meaning unburnt, was likely a result of confusion. Both 'brent' and 'unbrent' were being used as a suffix for the church in its later medieval documentation, though 'brent' was the earlier form of 1233. One of the church's multiple suffix variations was in combusto, meaning that it was 'in the burnt area'. This used in some sources as one word, incombusto, which may have been incorrectly taken to mean it was 'unbrent'.

== Location ==
St Mary's was founded in the heart of Anglo-Scandinavian enclave at Norwich, north of the River Wensum. The church's exact site in Norwich fronted onto the west side of Magdalen Street and also stood on the south side of Golden Dog Lane, the latter of which was likely an original churchyard path. The extent of the church's enclosed area was calculated by Ayers et al to be around a third of an acre. There is no evidence, archaeological or otherwise, concerning the form or size of the church building itself. The present property boundaries may still trace the outline of the churchyard today.

The church's parish was narrow north-to-south. Its southern extent only reached around one tenement from the churchyard, and its northern extent around three tenements. The boundary to the west was east of Snaylegate (now Calvert Street), though was not as far as the western enclosure of the nearby burh. East of Magdalen Street this boundary went as far as the 'common ditch', which was the line of Anglo-Scandinavian defences west of the Dalymond stream.
