= The Waterfront, Norwich =

Entertainment venue and nightclub in Norwich, England

The Waterfront is a live music venue and nightclub in King Street, Norwich, Norfolk. It is located on the bank of the River Wensum, opposite Norwich Riverside. It has been managed by the Union of UEA Students since 1993. It is not, however, a student club, and entrance is open to the public. The building comprises two floors. The ground floor contains a 700 capacity main room with integral bar, dressing rooms and toilets. The first floor features a 200 capacity room, a café bar and an open plan office. The Waterfront has hosted bands and artists including Pulp, Radiohead, Nirvana, The Verve, Arctic Monkeys, The Prodigy, Amy Winehouse, Stereophonics, Paul Weller, Buzzcocks, MGMT, Travis, Moby, Ellie Goulding, and Foals.

The Waterfront was built on the site of the former church St Clement Conesford.

== See also ==
- Norwich Arts Centre
