= Norwich cockeys =

Subterranean rivers of Norwich

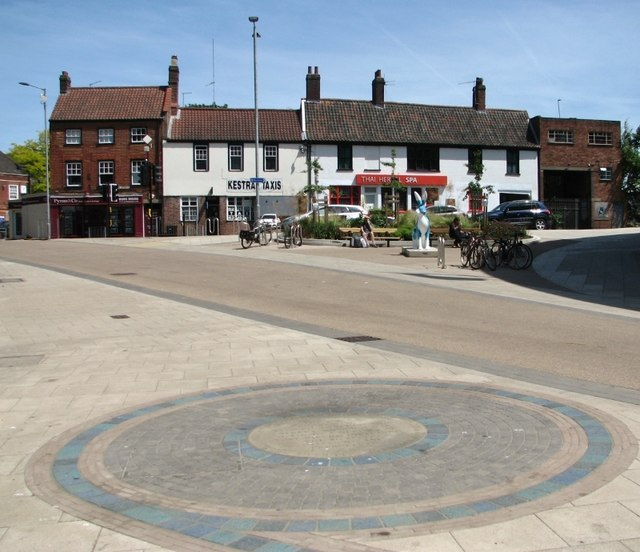
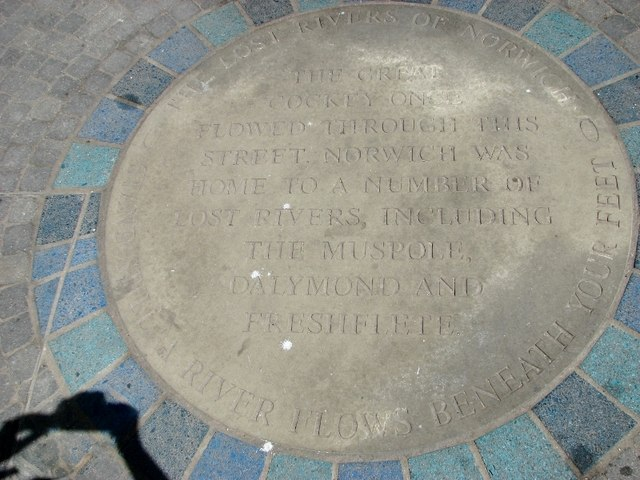
A floor plaque marking "the lost rivers of Norwich" above Jack's Pit, the source of the Great Cockey on the pedestrian Surrey Street/All Saints Street junction

The subterranean or underground rivers of the English city of Norwich, referred to locally as its cockeys, are the tributaries of the River Wensum, originating from both springs and runoff, that were built over and culverted during the growth and urbanisation of the city. These cockeys, which all now flow through culverts, include the Muspole and Dalymond on the north side of the river, and the Great Cockey, Dallingfleet, and Fresflete on the south.

The main cockeys are likely spring-fed, and these springs emerge where free-draining sands and gravels meet the underlying chalk in the city. The outflows of the cockeys into the river have historically been referred to as cockey mouths or possible cockey heads. There are and were numerous smaller cockeys that either went unnamed or named according to their local parish, bridge, or personal names.

== History ==
Most of the streams that became known as cockeys are named in early surviving documentation of Norwich, and they impacted upon the early development of the city. Not all the cockeys were accessible to the general public during the 15th century, and at this time their upkeep was an accepted responsibility of the city. In 1409–10, oak was bought in order to repair an unknown cockey, and bricks or tiles were bought in 1410–11 to fix a cockey near the Whitefriars. In 1467, a city assembly order dictated that the levelling of a street should start at the higher end of the water course so as not to impede water flow down to the great gutters, or 'lez cokeys'. Authorities paid for the "dydalling of the [...] cockeys mouths at the rivers side", referring to the end of the cockeys. They also refer to 'cockey heads', possibly a synonym. Records suggest the cockeys were seen as important for carrying away waste, particularly when covered over, but were not meant to be used indiscriminately. 'Cisterns' were associated with the cockeys from the 1630s onward, and four or five of these were recorded by the early 18th century.

== Etymology ==
The use of the term 'cockey', as well as its derivatives including 'cockeyfyer' and 'cockey keepers', is unique to Norwich. It was used from the medieval period onward, though in early modern accounts its use is ubiquitous. Its origin is debated among historians. John Kirkpatrick argued cockeys to be 'gutters,' or 'kennels,' or sewers in the modern sense. Reverend William Hudson, citing unnamed authorities, once made the claims that the name 'cockey' for the tributaries may come from the Celtic 'kok,' that he claimed meant a hollow or a water channel, or Saxon 'cuic' or 'cuc,' which he said meant living or running water. Both of these are doubtful according to more recent research. One more recent suggestion is that it may be from the Old Norse 'kok' or 'koka', meaning gullet, throat or pelvis, as well as the Middle English 'e', meaning stream.

== North side of the Wensum ==
The cockeys on the north side of the river seem to have disappeared from view earlier than those on the south.

=== Muspole ===
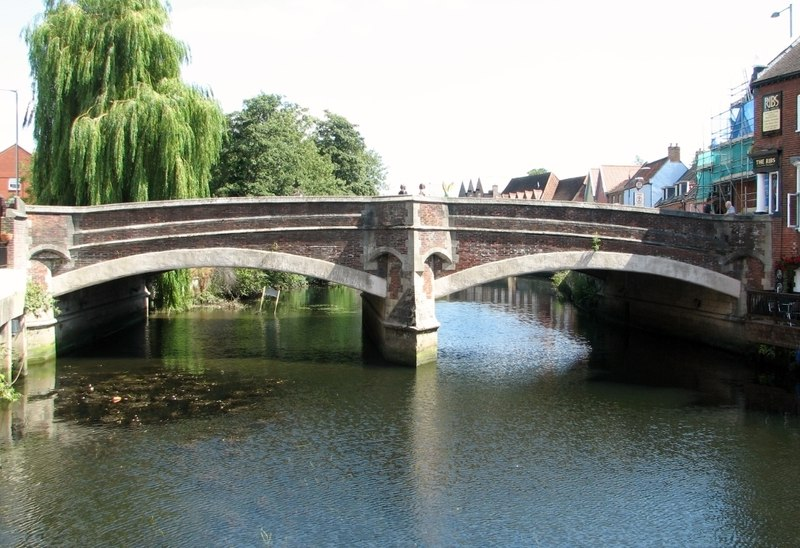
The Muspole culvert now outflows under Fye Bridge

The Muspole or Muspol was possibly spring-fed, its name being from the 'water of Muspool'. It was relatively broad and open, though short. It arose near a pool near the church of St George Colegate, and at one point was diverted along the street Colegate, likely in the 13th century. From here, it cuts through St Clement's. Its culvert now outflows underneath Fye Bridge, though in the past entered the river between the Fye and Blackfriars bridges.

=== Spiteldyke ===
Spiteldyke arose nearby St Paul's church before crossing Norman's Lane, bending to cross Rotten Row and then joining the Dalymond cockey.

=== Dalymond ===
The Dalymond, or Dalymond Dyke, is the only Norwich cockey whose source existed outside the walls of the city, and the longest of those on the north side of the river. Its course is visible in the modern topography of northern Norwich, with a shadow valley bordered by Waterloo Road to the west and Sprowston Road to the east near the city walls. Inside the walls, it moves from the parish boundary of St Augustine's and St Paul's into St Saviour's and St Edmund's. The strong north-south property boundary east of Edward Street likely marks its western edge before it curves eastward with the street. From here, its original course continued eastward, however it has since been diverted southward, forming an abuttal for a property on Boltoph Street. At St Edmund's parish, Spiteldyke connects with it, and it crosses Fishergate before flowing into the Wensum near Whitefriars Bridge, though this outflow has been canalized due to infilling of the river margins, and is obscured.

This cockey subdivided the Ultra Aquam area of the city in the medieval era. Due to a construction development in 1985, the Dalymond was temporarily visible, flowing through stanchion pits east of Peacock Street on the north bank of the river.

== South side of the Wensum ==
=== Great Cockey ===
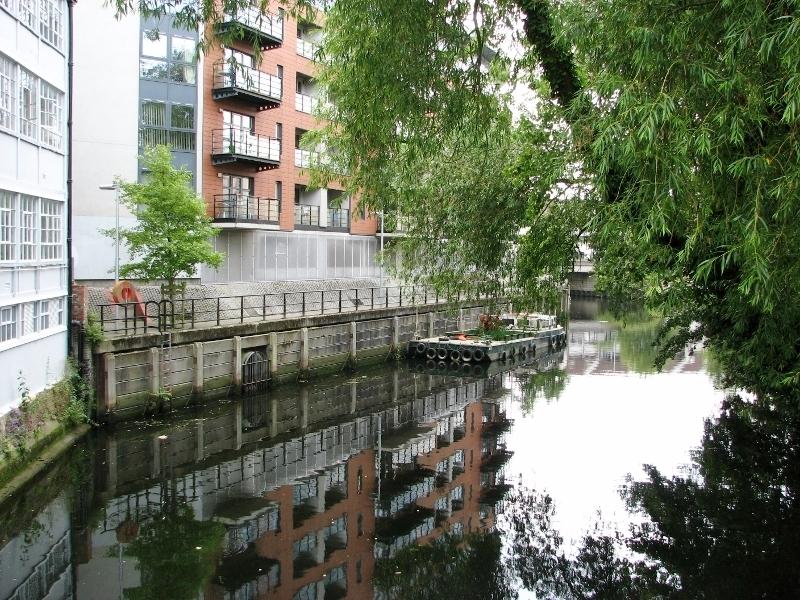
River wall outflow of the Great Cockey culvert into the River Wensum, upstream from St George's Bridge

The Great Cockey had a probable source, known as Jakkes or Jack's Pit, a spring on Ber Street's southern escarpment, now on the junction between Surrey Street and All Saints Green. Other sources state that the river arose just inside the city walls. Either way, it continued down the major valley through the parishes of St Stephen and St Peter Mancroft, and between the city's castle and great marketplace, by flowing north along what is now the Back of the Inns or London Lane, west along the what in c. 1720 was known as Cockey Lane, now Little London Street, and north again through St Andrew's and St John Maddermarket. The stream then flows into the Wensum immediately upstream of St George's Bridge.

It is more defined in records than other cockeys, partly due to its size and also partly due to its use as a boundary. It was used in early deeds as the abuttal to several properties, being the eastern boundary of multiple properties of Jews in the 13th century. Bridges existed over the Great Cockey on St Andrew's Street as well as on London Street; the latter of these is documented in a 1365/6 deed and was named Kokeiebrigg. The parish boundary between All Saints' and St Stephen's parishes was formed by this cockey, as was the northern part of the east boundary of St Peter Mancroft parish. The west boundary of St Andrew's parish followed the line of the Great Cockey from St Andrew's Street until it flowed into the Wensum, forming this boundary with St John Maddermarket after c. 1551 when St Crowche's parish was divided between St John's and St Andrew's. and this may have also been the case for St Christopher's parish. The construction of the Dominican friary near the south bank of the Wensum included the infilling of this side of the river margin where the Great Cockey would have entered the Wensum, and this infilling possibly contained its flow. In the early Tudor period, a grate at the 'head' of the Great Cockey was replaced by a new large iron grate. The stream now has the most obvious of the culvert outflows, through a grill in the river wall. In 1962, its culvert was broken by development on Castle Street, leading to localised flooding.

=== Dallingfleet ===
The Dallingfleet, or Dallingflete, also known as Grey Friars creek, emerged from the eastern slope of an escarpment, also within the precinct of the Greyfriars. It entered the Wensum close to the southern boundary of the medieval Norwich Cathedral close. In the medieval era, it was crossed using a stone bridge, which was still visible in 1888 and possibly still exists beneath Horsefair off Prince Of Wales Road.

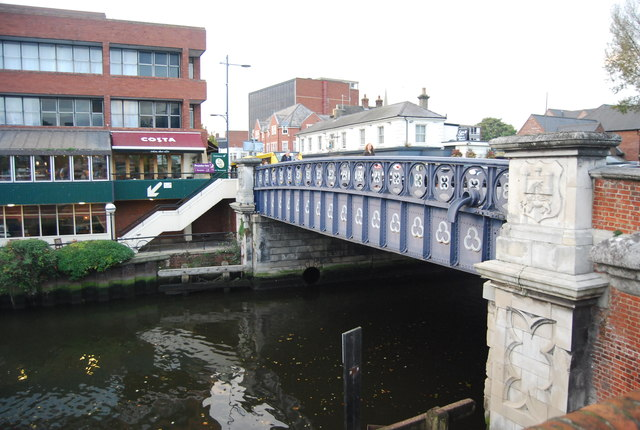
The Fresflete culvert outflows under Foundry Bridge

=== Fresflete ===
The Fresflete, or 'ffreslet', is one of three of the cockeys which rise within the precinct of the Greyfriars. It outflows under Foundry Bridge.

=== Briggs Cockey ===
One cockey was located next to St Clement Conesford, and was referred to as Briggs Cockey during the 17th and 18th centuries. This was named after the Briggs, a family of aldermen and mayors, who owned the property at this time. A Cockey Lane, distinct from the lane of the same name at London Street, followed the path of this cockey between King Street and the Wensum, and is now known as Abbey Lane. The cockey was still visible in 1735; the Norwich River and Street Committee was obliged to order a resident to "remove his Colder in the Cockey Lane near his house in St Julians or board the same up to prevent choaking up the Cockey".

== Other cockeys ==
=== Unnamed cockeys ===
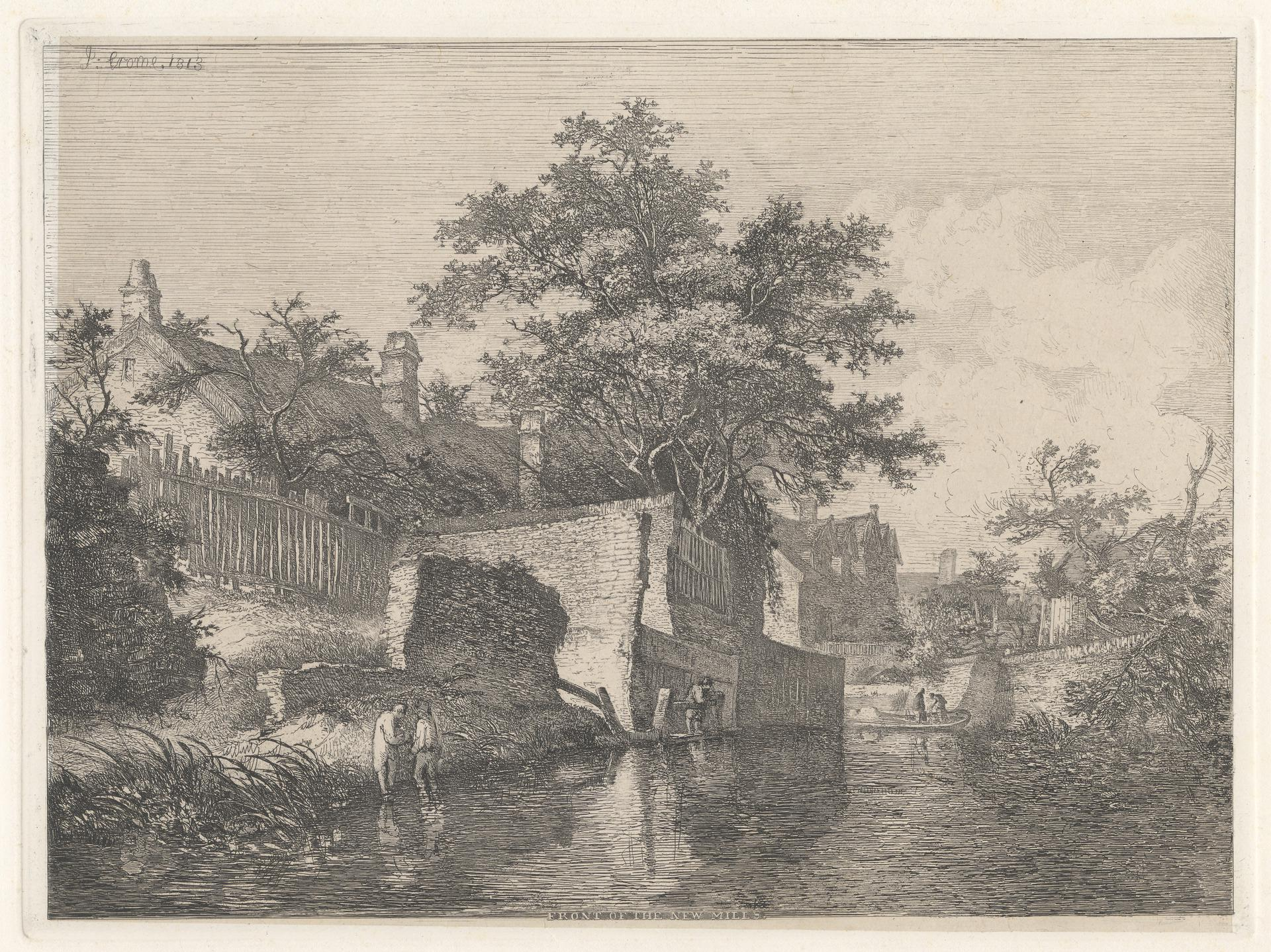
The New Mills, River Wensum and cockey in 1818, by John Crome

An unnamed cockey rose from a pit at the end of Pit Lane near St Giles' Church, and flowed north along Willow Lane, a valley where willows grew in the 16th century, then along St Swithin's Lane before crossing Upper and Lower Westwick, entering the Wensum between the New Mills and St Margaret's staithe. One unnamed stream ran west from near the Gildencroft.

Run-off from Ber Street ridge also approached the river along what became known as Cockey Lane. Kirkpatrick referred to a cockey that ran down the north end of the marketplace and joined the Great Cockey. Another cockey, following a similar short path to the Dallingfleet and Fresflete, entered the Wensum at the bend just above St Anne's staithe near the Church of St Michael in Conesford. Another ran from nearby the Great Hospital, parallel to Bishopsgate, and flowed into the river just north of Bishop Bridge. Further cockeys were recorded at Heigham Gate, and were associated with the drain and dike that ran along the city wall between the Heigham and St Benet's gates. Another, also at St Benet's Gate, may have been 'new made' in the late 15th century and was associated with accounts of a drain and cistern. A 'great cockey', separate from the actual Great Cockey, reportedly ran outside St Stephen's Gate and on the main route to London.

=== Named subsidiary cockeys ===
Some cockeys were known by their parish names, but are difficult to distinguish from the major cockey streams. These were St Andrew's, St Anne's, St Clement's, St Edmund's and St Paul's, St Faith's, St George Colegate, St Giles's, St Gregory's, St James's, St Lawrence's, St Martin-at-Palace, St Michael Coslany, St Paul's, St Simon's and St Swithin's. Others were named after bridges, including the Blackfriars, Fye, and Whitefriars bridges. Accounts refer only to a drain or gutter on the outer side of Bishop Bridge. Others were given place names, including behind the Angel and the White Lion public houses, 'the Friars cockey', and the hospital dike or hospital cockey between Rotten Row and Colegate. Others were described as the cockeys by the mills, the common staithe cockey, and 'the Bull cockey'.

More refer to personal names, especially those of families prominent in the affairs of the city. These include Mr Sheriff Anguish's, Mr Briggs's, Elmeham's, Mr Goldman's, Mr Hassett's, Mr Hornsey's, Mr Howse's, Mr Layer's, Mr Mingay's, Mr Norrys's, Mr Pitcher's, and Mr (Edmund) Toft's, and the cockey near Sir Henry Gaudy's house. Anguish's cockey, in St Faith's Lane, is possibly the same as the Friars cockey.

== See also ==
- Subterranean rivers of London
- Norwich city walls
