= St Clement Conesford =

Lost church in Norwich, England

- St Clement at the Well
- St Clement Conesford
- 52°37′28″N 1°18′09″E
- OS grid reference: TG 23620 08096
- Location: Norwich, Norfolk
- Country: England

History
- Status: Lost
- Dedication: Clement of Rome

Architecture
- Demolished: After 1744

St Clement Conesford, also known as St Clement at the Well, was a medieval church in the Conesford ward of the city of Norwich in Norfolk, England. It likely stood on the east side of King Street on the corner with Abbey Lane, opposite the junction with what is now Music House Lane. Possibly founded before the Norman Conquest, its advowson entered secular ownership in 1353. Its parish united with that of St Julian's in 1482. demolished after 1744, and completely removed by 1885. Human bones from the churchyard were recovered due to 1962 construction work. Its site is now that of the Waterfront.

== Dedication and naming ==
The church's dedication is to Clement of Rome, which may indicate Danish activity in the Conesford area. St Clement Conesford is one of two dedications to St Clement in Norwich, the other being St Clement Colegate. Pre-Reformation, there was a known total of seven of these dedications in Norfolk, all of which are next to rivers or the coast, 34 in the Danelaw, and 50 in England. Clement had a strong association with water due to the manner in which he was martyred. Francis Blomefield recorded an alternate name for St Clement Conesford being St Clement at the Well, "from a common well or cistern that was near it". It is known that St Clement's was nearby to Briggs Cockey, and this 'well' may have been the source of that stream, or the stream itself as the Old English wella meant 'stream'. Saint Clement had a frequent association with wells and springs. There may have also been a ford south of the church, or a ford to the north between St Clement and St Michael Conesford.

== History ==
The church may have been established before the Norman Conquest, though the date of its foundation is unknown. It has been argued by B. E. Crawford that this church, as well as others in England, were founded by Aethelred as a part of his 1008–09 defensive naval response to Danish raids; it may have been a house church for a garrison for Aethelred's fleet. It may have then been taken over under the reign of King Cnut, becoming a symbol of Danish authority. It might have been owned by one or more merchants or traders who possibly used the church to give thanks for their successful journeys. The church was not named in the Domesday Book, though it named fewer than a fifth of Norwich's churches and chapels.

The first surviving reference to the church was in 1266, when clerk, justice and substantial landowner William de Wendling purchased its advowson from Henry de Witton. This reference is late compared to other first references to Norwich churches. After this, it is very likely that the advowson was donated to Wendling Abbey, a house of Premonstratensian canons which had been founded around 1265. From 1291, the churchyard is mentioned as an abuttal in several deeds, and from 1324, it was referred to as a cemetery.

=== 1353–18th century: Secular and city ownership ===
In 1353, the abbot of Wendling released St Clement's advowson to secular ownership; it was acquired by William de Middleton before passing through a number of other secular owners. In 1390, rector Thomas de Birkeley bequeathed five marks toward the construction of the bell tower of the nearby St Peter Mancroft church, which is the first known reference to that tower. In 1440, Adam Gosselyn bequeathed money for the leading of St Clement's new tower. In 1456, the abbot transferred the advowson to the city, but this did not last long and the city attempted to amalgamate the parish with that of St Julian's. While this was initially resisted by the prioress of Carrow who was a patron of St Julian's, the city in 1482 gave up its rights to St Clement's and allowed the prioress to present to a united benefice of St Julian's, St Clement's, and St Edward's. Despite this, services were still held at St Clement's; a chaplain was allocated to serve the St Clement's part of this larger parish.

In 1549, the city seized the church after declaring it a 'free chapel'. It stated that it did this 'as a testimony of the right this church had to receive the tithes of 10 acres of arable land, lying between Needham or St. Stephen's-gates, and Greenowmill-hill, the account of it being entered there'. The mass book was taken to the Guildhall, and the city sold off the church's bells as well as lead from the north aisle before demolishing part of its steeple. In 1560, the church and churchyard passed into private hands. In 1744, the building was still standing and was being used for secular means.

=== Demolition ===
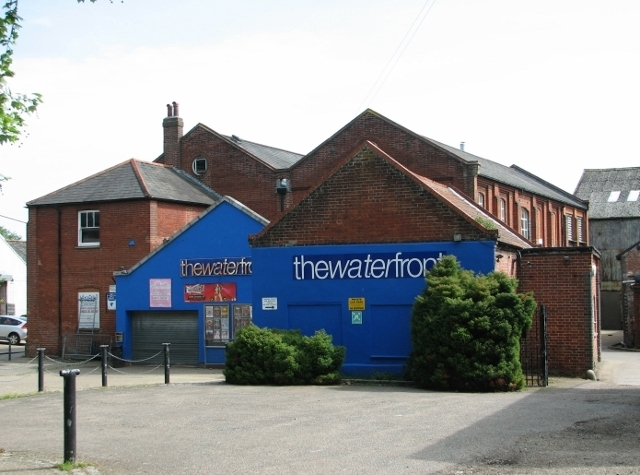
The former site of the church is now taken up by the Waterfront

The church was eventually partially demolished, though it is unclear exactly when this took place. A large amount of its fabric was standing in the mid-18th century, and stood until at least 1829 as these sections were incorporated into other buildings. An undated map drawn for a city engineer, possibly of around 1830, depicts a building of around 12 metres (40 ft) east to west which may have incorporated the remains of St Clement's. By 1885, the Ordnance Survey map shows that this structure had been pulled down, and the area had been built over.

== St Ann's Chapel ==
St Ann's Chapel was likely a chapel attached to St Clement Conesford which possibly stood in its churchyard, dedicated to Saint Anne, whose cult was flourishing in Norwich by the early 14th century. This chapel was demolished in 1370. Blomefield incorrectly surmised that St Ann's was its own church, and J. Campbell reiterated this assertion though questioned whether this 'church' had parochial status. This was shown to be false by Elizabeth Rutledge.

== Location ==
Based upon a document dating to 1398 and copied into the Norwich Liber Albus, It is known that St Clement Conesford stood on the east side of King Street on the corner with Abbey Lane, opposite the junction with what was Skeydegate or Skyegate (now truncated and known as Music House Lane), and nearby Briggs Cockey. This is now the site of the Waterfront. The church's exact location is uncertain. On Thomas Cleer's 1696 map the church is depicted immediately behind a row of houses fronting King Street, and Francis Blomefield's 1741 map concurred with this.

== Parish ==
As St Clement's parish was subsumed by that of St Julian's, evidence concerning its parish boundaries are largely derived from enrolled deeds and reconstructive maps. Its eastern boundary was formed by the river Wensum, with the western boundary demarcated by the foot of the slope upon which Ber Street resides. The southern boundary likely ran along the north wall of Music House when it was east of King Street, and then a trajectory following the north wall of the former Ship Inn once it was west of King Street. The northern boundary went along the east end of Skyegate, then may have either been around three tenements north of Cockey Lane, or followed the lane itself.

== Archaeology ==
As of 2015, no part of the church itself has seen archaeological excavation. There was demolition and construction work on the site in 1962, which badly damaged the church site, though uncovered the human bones of up to 41 people, likely from churchyard burials, during a watching brief. These were examined by staff from Norwich Castle Museum, and all dated to the medieval period. A large number of them were children (around 38%), signalling a high child mortality rate and generally poor health in the parish. Medieval pottery was additionally recovered. There was another watching brief in 1986 which found a north-south aligned flint wall that had been knap-faced to the east, though it was not determined if this was associated with the church or churchyard.
