= Mendham Priory =

Priory in Mendham, Suffolk, England

Coordinates: 52.3881°N 1.3215°E

Mendham Priory was a priory in Suffolk, England.
