= St Peter Parmentergate =

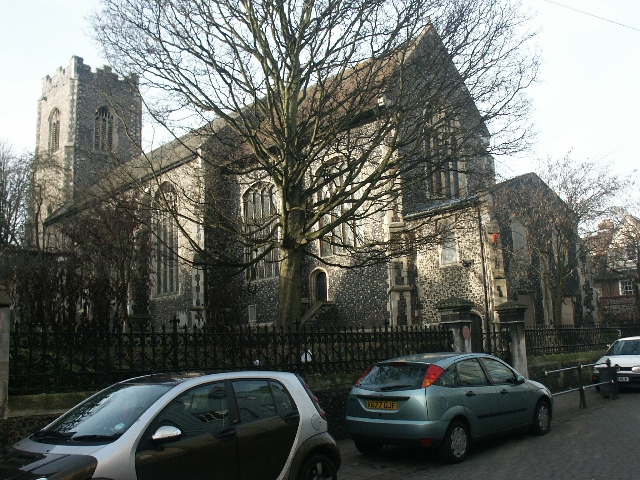
- St Peter Parmentergate, Norwich
- St Peter Parmentergate
- 52°37′38″N 1°17′58″E
- OS grid reference: TG 23391 08373
- Location: Norwich, Norfolk
- Country: England
- Denomination: Church of England

History
- Dedication: St Peter

Architecture
- Heritage designation: Grade I listed

St Peter Parmentergate (also Permountergate) is a Grade I listed redundant parish church in the Church of England in Norwich.

== History ==
The church is medieval and was rebuilt in 1486. The church closed in 1980 when the congregation moved to St John the Baptist Church, Timberhill, Norwich. In 1994 the vestry was leased by the Norwich Historic Churches Trust to the Magdalene Group.

In 2005, the church became the Norwich Centre for Martial Arts. In 2019 it reopened again as a medieval combat training arena.

== Organ ==
A specification of the Norman and Beard organ that was formerly in the church can be found on the National Pipe Organ Register. It was transferred to Norwich School.

== Current use ==
The medieval church is currently used as an indoor skatepark, run by the charity Community East.

In 2021, it became the location of long-standing Norwich skate shop, Drug Store.

The skatepark opened in December 2022.
