= St Martin at Palace =

Church in Norwich, England

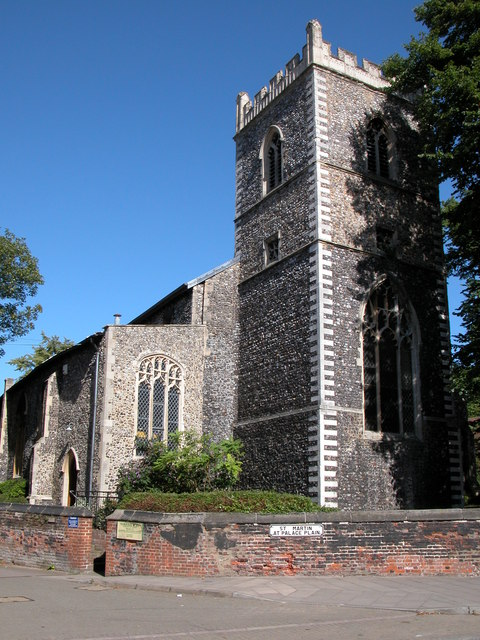
- St Martin at Palace in 2006
- St Martin at Palace
- 52°38′1.1″N 1°18′3.3″E
- OS grid reference: TG 23477 09108
- Location: Norwich, Norfolk
- Country: England
- Denomination: Church of England

History
- Dedication: Martin of Tours

Architecture
- Heritage designation: Grade I listed

St Martin at Palace is a Grade I listed redundant parish church in the Church of England in Norwich. It stands upon St Martin at Palace Plain.

== Dedication and naming ==
The church was dedicated to a Saint Martin following the Norman Conquest, though this may have been a re-dedication. The dedication is specifically to Martin, bishop of Tours, evidenced by the 1333 will of Richard Berton which called it "St Martin the Bishop". The church's position at an entrance to the city south of the River Wensum corresponds to Martin's association with gateways through his charity to a beggar at the gates of Amiens.

St Martin at Palace has variously been known in 1254 as St Martin ad portam episcopi, in 1288 as Sancti Martini del Hill, in 1290 as Sancti Martini ad Montem, in 1558 as St Martins at the Pallis Gate, and in 1627 as Sancti Martini super Montem.

== History ==
Based on archaeological evidence, there were three phases of the building prior to the Norman Conquest. The church was held by Archbishop Stigand in 1066, according to the Domesday Book. Alongside 12 acres of land following the Norman Conquest, it changed hands to William of Noyers. King Henry I gave a grant in the 12th century to the Norwich Cathedral priory that might have included St Martin, as it included "the bishop's land to the river and from the bridge of St Martin to the land of St Michael." The Taxation of 1254 valued the church at 20s, which placed it in the top 30% of Norwich parish churches at the time. By 1291, its valuation had dropped to 8s. At an unknown date prior to 1313, the church's revenues were allocated to the cathedral infirmary. Significant information on the church's income and expenditure is preserved on the 38 annual account rolls of the infirmarer from 1313 to 1538.

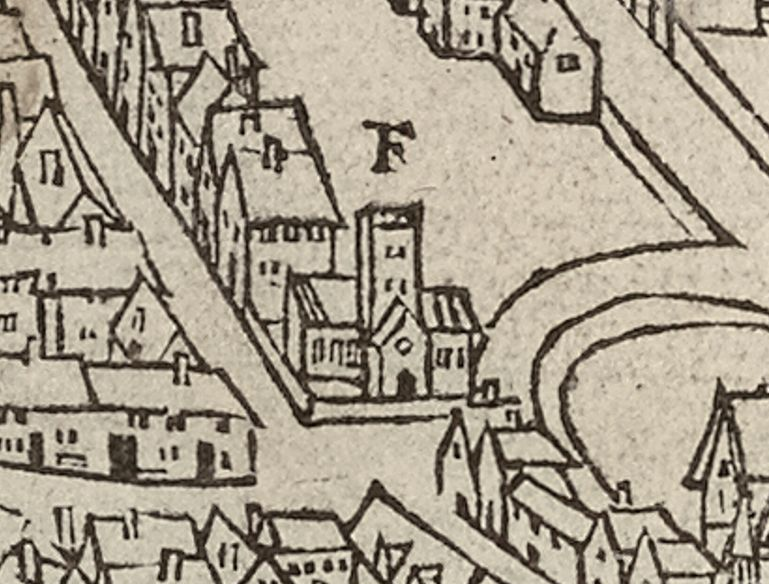
St Martin as depicted on the 1558 Cuningham Prospect

In 1589, the chaplain of St Martin at Palace John Harrison was deprived by the puritan Court of High Commission for balking at the surplice and the sign of the cross in baptism.

In 1851, a partial collapse of the nave and chancel led to a restoration under J H Hakewill, and less than 20 years later a clerestory and belfry were added as well. St Martin at Palace became a Grade I listed building in 1954.

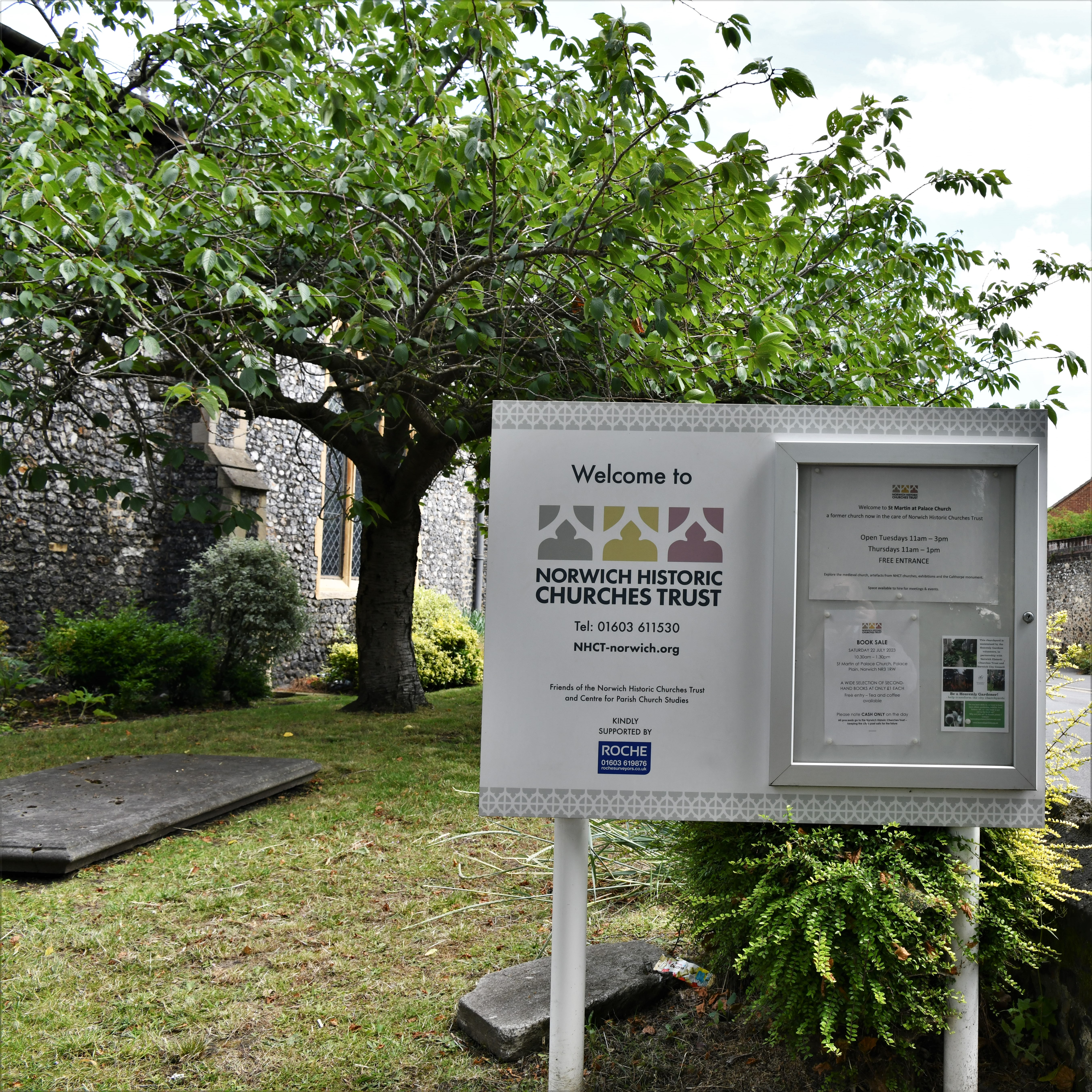
The church is now the main office of the Norwich Historic Churches Trust

The church was closed in 1971, and was initially used as the store of the Diocesan Furnishings Officer with the purpose of re-homing unneeded church furniture. The Probation Service took it over in 1987 due to its proximity to the Norwich Law Courts, adding a unique three-tier structure to the nave interior. MoveOn East then took it over until 2012, and it stood empty until 2017. It is now under the management of the Norwich Historic Churches Trust, acting as its administrative office.

== Burials ==
- Edmund Sheffield, 1st Baron Sheffield
- Lady Elizabeth Calthrop (d. 1578)
- Thomas Larwood (d. 1698), merchant
- John Barker (d. 1730), St Martin at Palace curate and Rector of Lammas with Little Hautbois.
- John Goodream (d. 1821)

== Organ ==
The church purchased an organ dating from 1863 by Corps and Son. This was rebuilt in 1887 by Norman & Beard, and restored in 1957 by Hill and Norman & Beard. The organ was transferred to St Mary and St Andrew's Church, Horsham St Faith by 1973.

== Parish ==
=== Boundaries ===
St Martin's parish is one of two Norwich riverside parishes whose boundaries cross the river, the other being St Michael Coslany. This area on the north side of the river is somewhat of an enclave. The parish's western boundary to the south of the Wensum was likely formed by one of its tributaries. The eastern boundary was originally bordering that of St Matthew's parish until St Martin absorbed this parish in about 1377.

=== St Martin at Palace Plain ===
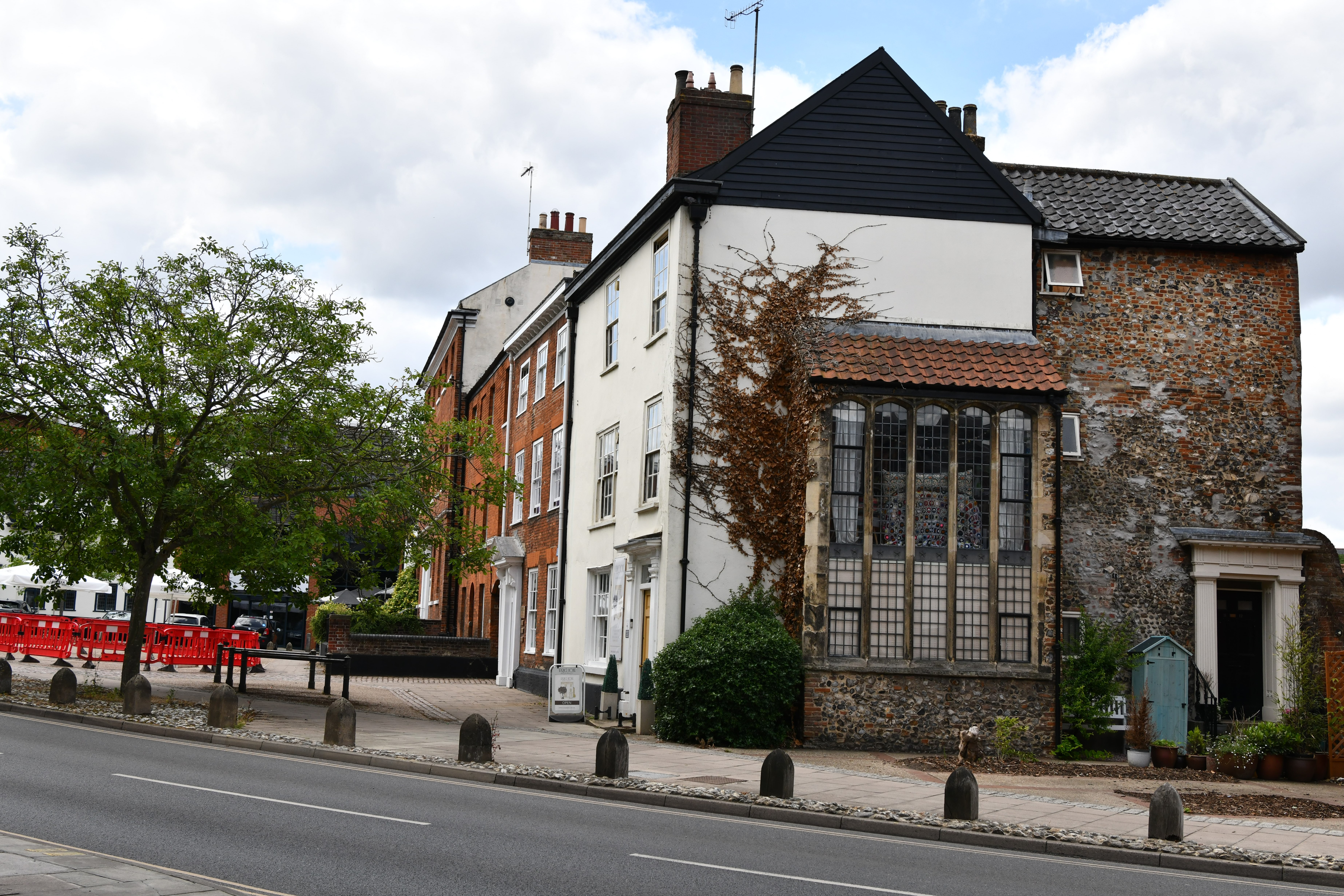
Houses on St Martin at Palace Plain

St Martin at Palace stands on St Martin at Palace Plain, formerly known as Bichil. This name possibly derived from the Old English bic or bicca meaning 'beak' as in a beak-like protrusion, referring to the small promontory of gravel on which the church stands that projected toward the Wensum. The Plain is adjacent to an early river crossing which included a bridge that was in place by at least 1106 and possibly pre-Conquest, now known as St Martin's or Whitefriars Bridge. Before the establishment of Norwich Cathedral close, the area was crossed by an east-west riverine road and a north-south road over the bridge and from Cowgate to Rose Lane. The area was used as a trading community with the church as an island in the middle. The present plain is likely smaller than this original market.
