= Norwich Over the Water =

Historic district in Norwich, UK

The area covered by the medieval leet of Ultra Aquam, from Hudson's map of Norwich (1892)

Norwich Over the Water (originally Ultra Aquam) was a medieval district or court leet within the English city of Norwich, one of the four courts in the city used to deal with offences by petty criminals. The term was later used as the name for the city's northernmost electoral district, until reorganisation occurred during the 1830s.

Norwich Over the Water has since been used as an unofficial name for the part of the city centre that lies north of the River Wensum, as well as by local community groups aiming to improve the infrastructure in that part of the city.

== History ==
=== Medieval ===
Ultra Aquam was the name of one of the court leets of the English city of Norwich. The area was located within the medieval walls to the north of the River Wensum. The leet was a court for the punishment of criminals for small offences.

After the city walls were built in 1290 CE, the area north of the river gradually became known as Norwich Over the Water. During the Tudor period, the name "Norwich Over the Water" was used in records used for the calculation of taxes and other official documents.

During the medieval period, Stump Cross, now under Magdalen Street, was once considered to be the centre of Norwich Over-the-Water. The site of a stone monument, it was one of the locations in the city where the accession of the new monarch was announced. The cross was mentioned in sources from 1500 and 1538. It was demolished during the 16th century, rebuilt in 1640, but then removed in 1644.

=== Post-medieval–1835 ===
Over the Water was one of four 'Great Wards' that existed inside the city boundary from 1404 to 1835, the other wards being Conisford, Mancroft, and Wymer. In 1832, electoral reforms ended the official use of the name. The ward continued to be known as Norwich Over the Water until 1835, when the city's local government was reorganised.

=== Campaigns to improve the area ===
During the 1970s, Norwich Over the Water, a group led by Jack Burton was formed to advocate for the improvement of the city centre north of the Wensum. A second Norwich Over the Water group put forward Paul Scruton as the Norwich over the Water Party candidate for the local council elections in 2002.

In February 2022, plans were made by Norwich over the Wensum to create a Neighbourhood Forum for the part of the city north of the river and south of a line following Barker Street, Magpie Road, and Bull Close Road, with the aim of developing a plan to "set out a vision for the area and shape developments in their community".

== Sources ==
- Hudson, William (1891). The Wards of the City of Norwich. Norwich: Jarrold and Sons. OCLC 17339392.
- Loveday, Michael (2011). The Norwich Knowledge: An A-Z of Norwich - the Superlative City. Michael Loveday. ISBN 978-09570-8-830-6.
