= St Edmund's Church, Norwich =

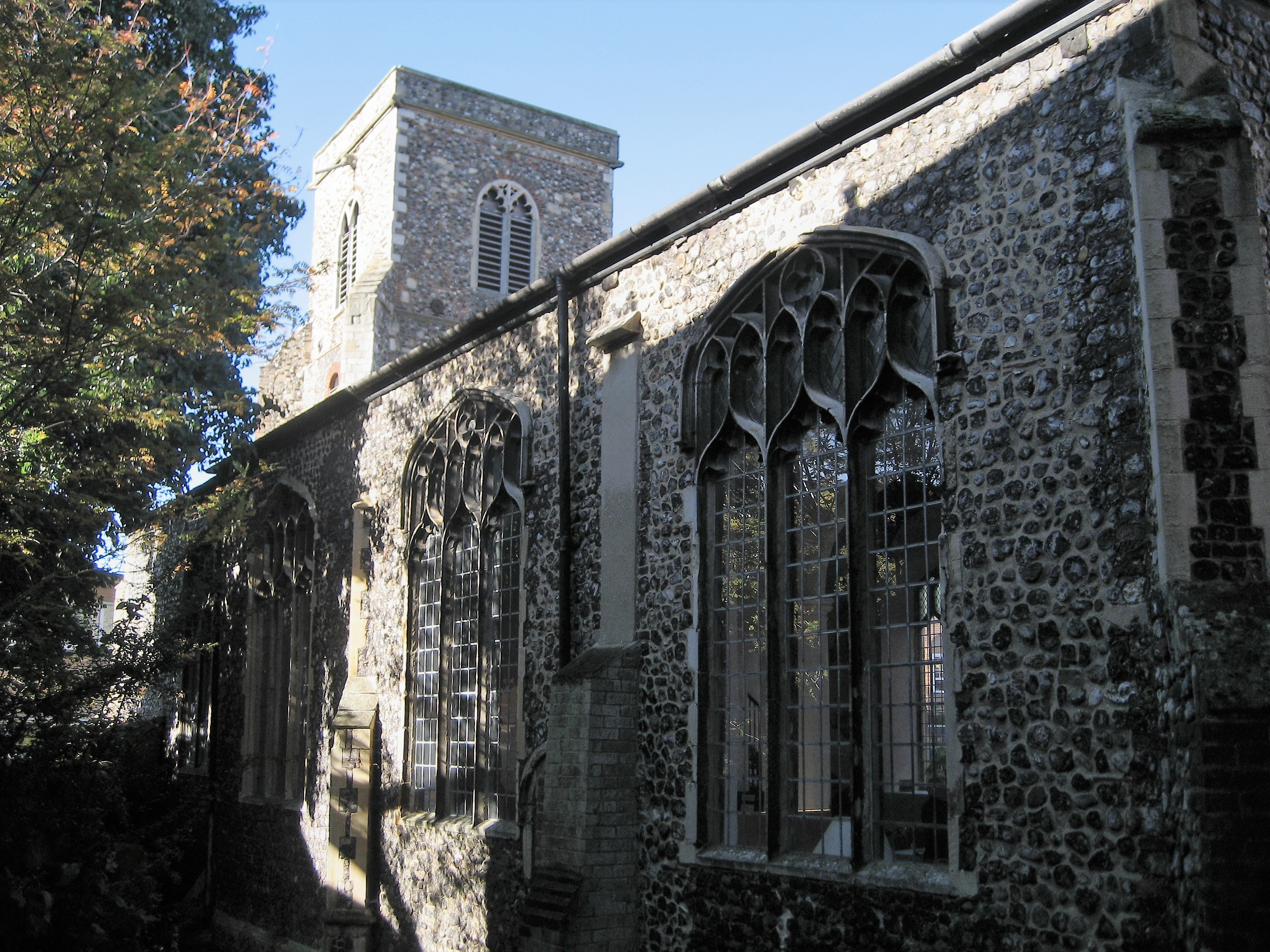
- St Edmund's Church, Norwich
- St Edmund's Church, Norwich
- 52°38′3.12″N 1°17′56.4″E
- OS grid reference: TG 23335 09164
- Location: Norwich, Norfolk
- Country: England
- Denomination: Church of England

History
- Dedication: St Edmund

Architecture
- Heritage designation: Grade I listed

St Edmund's Church, Norwich is a Grade I listed redundant parish church in the Church of England in Norwich.

== History ==
The church is medieval dating from the 13th century. The nave was restored in the 1860s by Richard Phipson and the chancel by Ewan Christian.

After being declared redundant as a parish church, the building was used as a factory store. Later it was used as the Norwich Pregnancy Crisis centre.

Use of the church ended in the 1950s. It became a cardboard box store for the factory located across the street, and then a shoe store for another factory. The fabric of the church was restored by the Norwich Historic Churches Trust which took over ownership in 1984. Following this, the Norwich Puppet Theatre located at St James Pockthorpe used the church as a scenery store. In 1992, the church was fitted with a western gallery with a first-floor kitchen and ground floor toilets in the tower, as well as two-storey rooms in its aisle's west end. From 1993 until 2010, Norwich Community Church used the premises, and from then until 2020 Call To Prayer resided there. After this, the volunteer-led community interest company Echo Youth Theatre used the space.

== Monuments ==
The church contains monuments to:

- Thomas Stones (d. 1627)
- Jeremiah Berry (d. 1767) by W. Lane of Norwich.
