= St Saviour's Church, Norwich =

St Saviour's Church
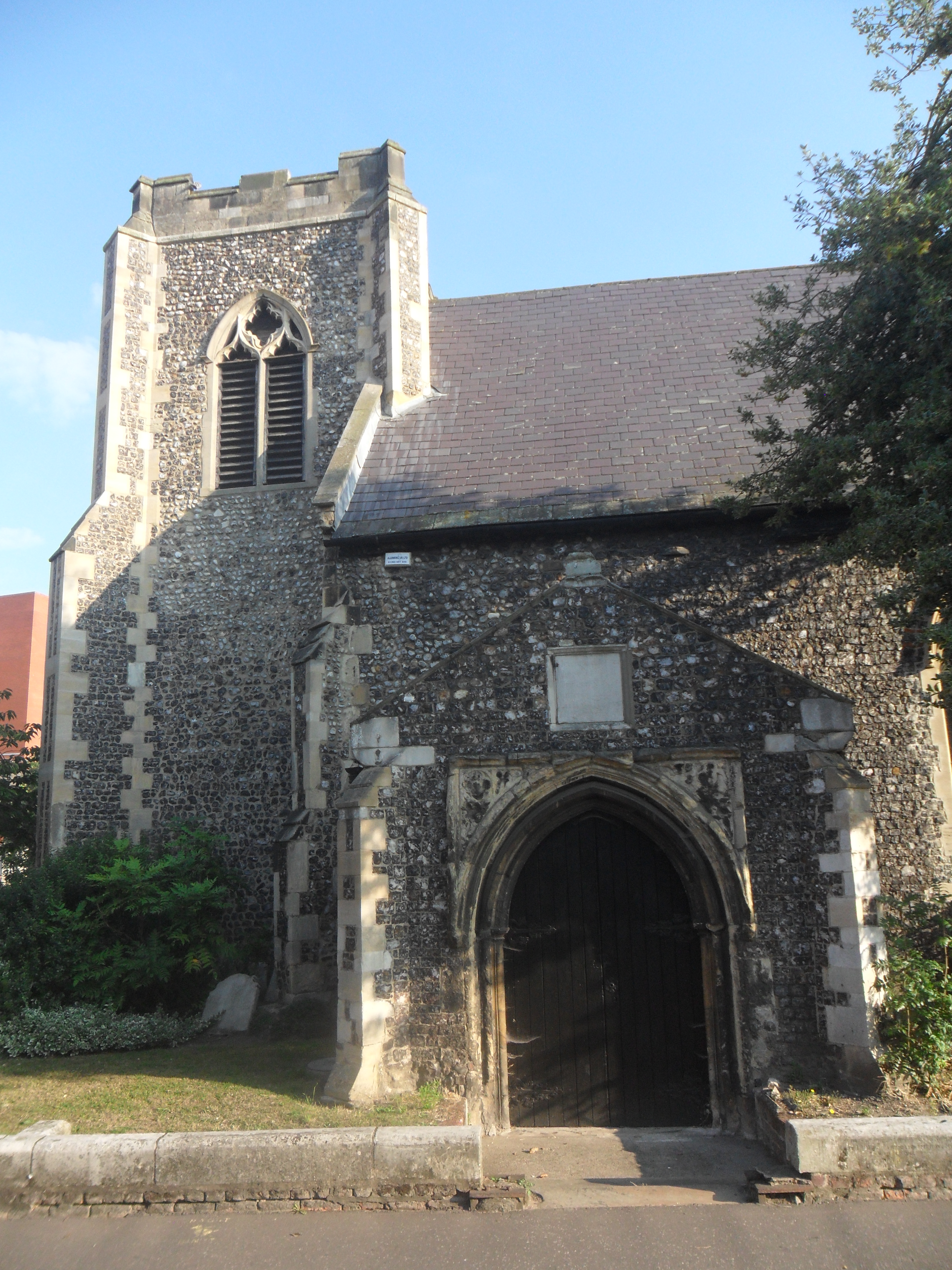
- St Saviour’s Church in 2013
- St Saviour's Church
- 52°38′6.49″N 1°17′48.72″E
- OS grid reference: TG 23186 09257
- Location: Norwich, Norfolk
- Country: England
- Denomination: Church of England

History
- Dedication: The Transfiguration of the Holy Saviour

Architecture
- Heritage designation: Grade I listed

St Saviour's Church is a Grade I listed redundant parish church of the Church of England located in the historical centre of Norwich, Norfolk in England. It is a relatively small church for Norwich, with a short tower. It is dedicated to St Saviour; Jesus, and is one of two churches in Norfolk with this dedication, the other now a ruin at Surlingham.

== History ==
Brian Ayers et al have surmised that St Saviour's was likely in existence prior to the year 1000 and possibly a century prior, based on its location. Its first documentary reference is visible in a charter of the Bishop of Norwich, John of Oxford, dateable between 1186 and 1200. Here, the church was referred to as (Ecclesia) sancti Salvatoris, and was granted to the almoner of Norwich Cathedral priory under petition from the church's patrons William Bardolf, Ralph Busing, and Robert son of Ulfketel Busing. They gave their donations to the church in return for their admission to confraternity in the cathedral priory's monastic community.

The present church building was largely built during the 14th and 15th centuries. It now resides metres from the Stump Cross Flyover, next to a car park.

=== Redundancy ===
After its closure as a church, St Saviour's became a parish hall and then a badminton or squash club, during which time the church became a Grade I listed building in 1954. It was then for a short time being diocesan furniture storage. In 1996, major works were undertaken on the church to turn it into a youth center named The Gate, associated with the King's Church (New Frontiers International Church). The Gate remained until 2010. The Thalia Theatre Company used it as an arts-related educational building for people with physical and sensory impairments or learning difficulties from 2011 to 2020. The Lighthouse made use of the church as a space for fostered young people for a short period after this.

In January 2024, The Pantry, a community pantry and advice centre managed by the St Giles Trust, was opened in the church by celebrity chef Delia Smith. The St Giles Trust was unable to sign on to a long lease agreement with the Norwich Historic Churches Trust (NHCT), which led to the expiry of their lease on 30 November 2025. In 2026, the UK branch of the Church of Pentecost was selected to be a tenant by the NHCT.

== Architecture ==
The small church's nave, chancel and short west tower date from the 14th and 15th centuries, though there was reworking in the 19th century. It is made of flint, with brick and stone dressings. The south porch was rebuilt in 1723 and the tower was lowered in a large restoration between 1852 and 1853. The church had an organ dating from 1861 by Mark Noble. The chancel was restored in 1923. 1990s renovations to turn it into a Christian youth centre revealed an intricate scissor-braced roof interior.

== Parish ==
Archbishop of Canterbury Matthew Parker was born in the parish. The composer Osbert Parsley is known to have bought a house and premises in the parish after his marriage to one Rose in 1558, owning this house until 1583. Elisha Phillipo, a third-generation wealthy Stranger, soap boiler, and later High Sheriff of Norfolk from 1675, lived in the parish from as early as 1634. He was buried in the chancel of St Saviour's with his wife Isabel in 1678.

== Sources ==
- Williamson, Fiona (2014). Social Relations and Urban Space: Norwich, 1600–1700. Studies in Early Modern Cultural, Political and Social History. Boydell & Brewer. doi:10.1017/9781782043959. ISBN 978-1-84383-945-3.
