= St Giles on the Hill =

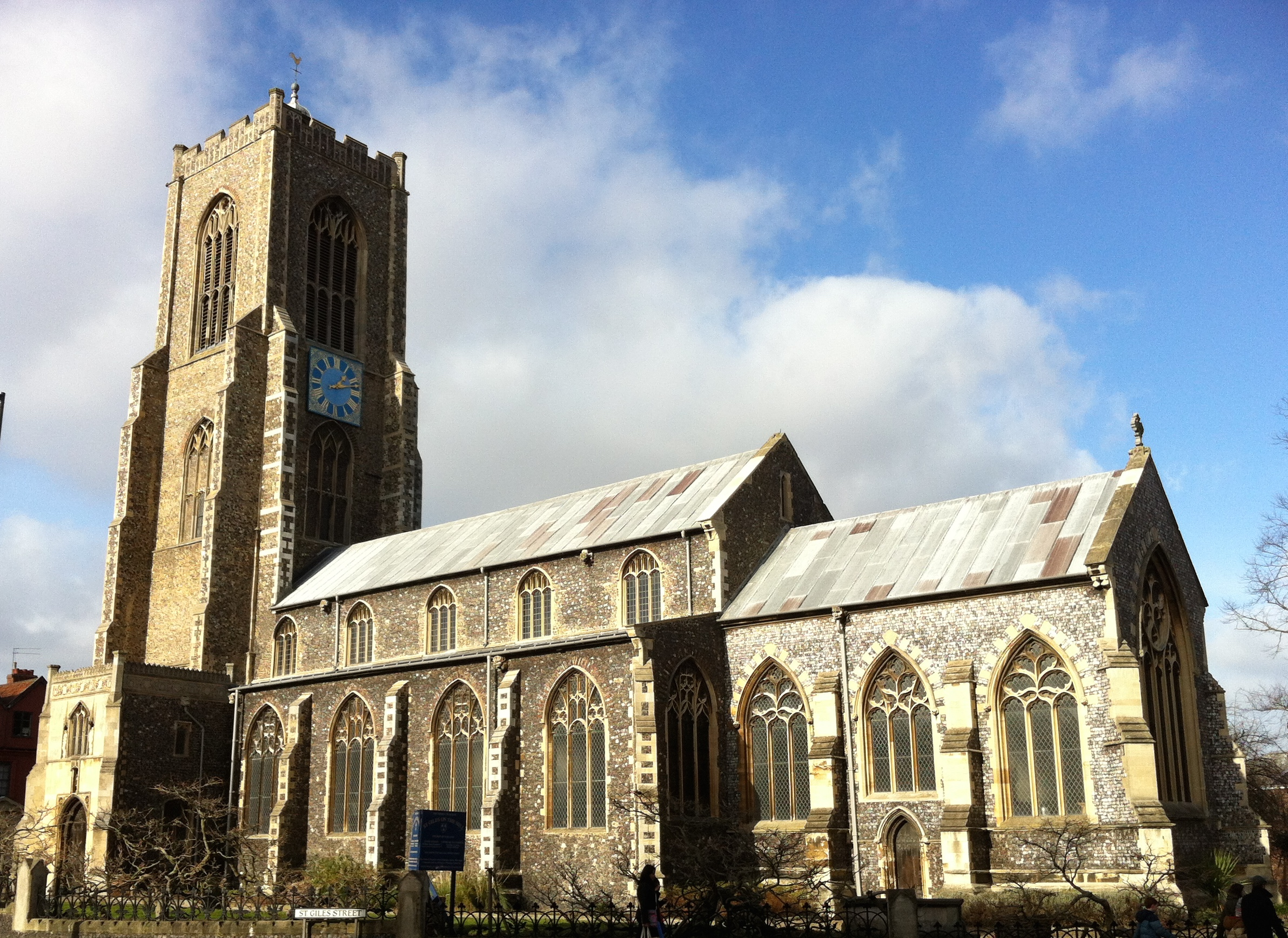
- St Giles on the Hill in 2015
- St Giles on the Hill
- 52°37′46.16″N 1°17′14.95″E
- OS grid reference: TG 22565 08599
- Location: Norwich, Norfolk
- Address: Upper St Giles Street, NR2 1AB
- Country: England
- Denomination: Church of England
- Churchmanship: Modern Catholic
- Website: stgileschurch.wordpress.com

History
- Status: Parish church
- Founded: c. 1100
- Dedication: Saint Giles

Architecture
- Functional status: Active
- Heritage designation: Grade I listed
- Designated: 26 February 1954
- Architect: RM Phipson (chancel)

Specifications
- Height: 113 feet (34 m)
- Materials: Flint and ashlar

Administration
- Diocese: Anglican Diocese of Norwich
- Archdeaconry: Norwich
- Deanery: Norwich East
- Parish: Norwich St Giles

St Giles on the Hill is a Grade I listed parish church in the Church of England in Norwich, Norfolk.

Likely founded in c. 1100 and dedicated to the hermit Saint Giles, St Giles's advowson was transferred to the Norwich Cathedral priory between 1136 and 1142. It experienced comfortable wealth until the mid-15th century and underwent a significant building campaign from 1400 to 1430. From the 1450s onward, its income decreased harshly and in 1581 its chancel was demolished, though this was rebuilt nearly three centuries later under architect RM Phipson in 1866. By the late 18th century, many of the medical staff of the Norfolk and Norwich Hospital were parishioners of St Giles on the Hill.

The church building, largely in a Perpendicular style, is located on the highest ground within Norwich at 85 feet (26 m) above sea level, and additionally features the tallest parish church tower in the city at 113 feet (34 m). Its porch contains the only example of a fan-vaulted ceiling in Norwich. Inside the church, there are two eagle lecterns and many wall monuments.

== History ==
=== c. 1100–1441: Founding, early references, wealth and building campaign ===
St Giles on the Hill was most likely founded in about 1100. It is one of 162 pre-Reformation parish churches in England dedicated to the hermit Saint Giles, and one of six in Norfolk. In 1106, the Norfolk magnate Robert Fitzwalter and his wife Sybil came from St Gilles du Gard, a monastery founded in the 8th century by Saint Giles himself. Dedications to Saint Giles became more popular in the 12th century. The church was founded on the estate of Elwyn the Priest. However, it is unlikely to have been founded by Elwyn "in [William] the Conqueror's time", as was argued by 18th-century antiquary Francis Blomefield, as there is no other evidence for the church being founded during the reign of William the Conqueror. The church's parish constituted one of three parishes which made up the French Borough in the city, alongside those of St Peter Mancroft and St Stephen.

The earliest documentary reference to the church dates to between 1136 and 1142, being in a charter from Bishop Eborard. This charter was about the transfer of the church's advowson to the Norwich Cathedral priory. This was followed by a confirmation charter by the Archbishop of Canterbury, Theobald, in 1145. The charter allowed a 20-day indulgence for those visiting the church during the feast of St Giles on 1 September and the week after. Initially a rectory, the church's revenues were redirected toward the Norwich Cathedral priory infirmary, and from then on a chaplain served the church.

The church was wealthy; in the 13th century, it saw £2 per year in income. Building work took place in 1345, and by the late 14th century income had increased to £3 6s 8d. A significant campaign of building took place on the church from around 1400 to 1430. Work was done on the windows in the chancel in 1409. Documentation of other building work is scant, possibly taken on as a responsibility by the chaplain. The church earned £4 in 1441.

=== Mid-15th–16th century: Decline in wealth and story of John Colton ===
In 1454, the church's income had dropped steeply to 6s 8d, which continued to only 1s 6d in 1461. The reason for this is unclear, though the church may have been paying off outstanding debt.

On a night in the 15th century, one John Colton (d. 1497) became lost when returning to Norwich, though heard the bells of St Giles which saved him from drowning and guided him to safety. To thank the church, he bequeathed a piece of land on Earlham Road to the parish. This land is now known as Colton's Acre. The curfew bell of St Giles is rung nightly as this is what Colton requested in his will, and the Colton's Acre General Trust is a charity which now aims to benefit the inhabitants of St Giles's parish.

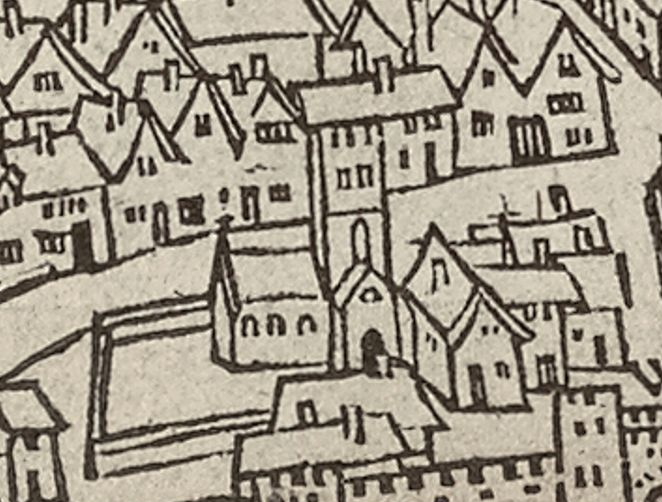
St Giles on the Hill as depicted on the 1559 Cuningham Prospect

The church's income was at 5s per year at the time of the Reformation. Motivated by this lack of income, the dean and chapter decided to demolish the church's chancel in 1581.

=== 17th century–present ===
One Henry Drury was indicted in August 1647 for using the Book of Common Prayer in St Giles's church; the act was deemed in contempt of the authority of parliament.

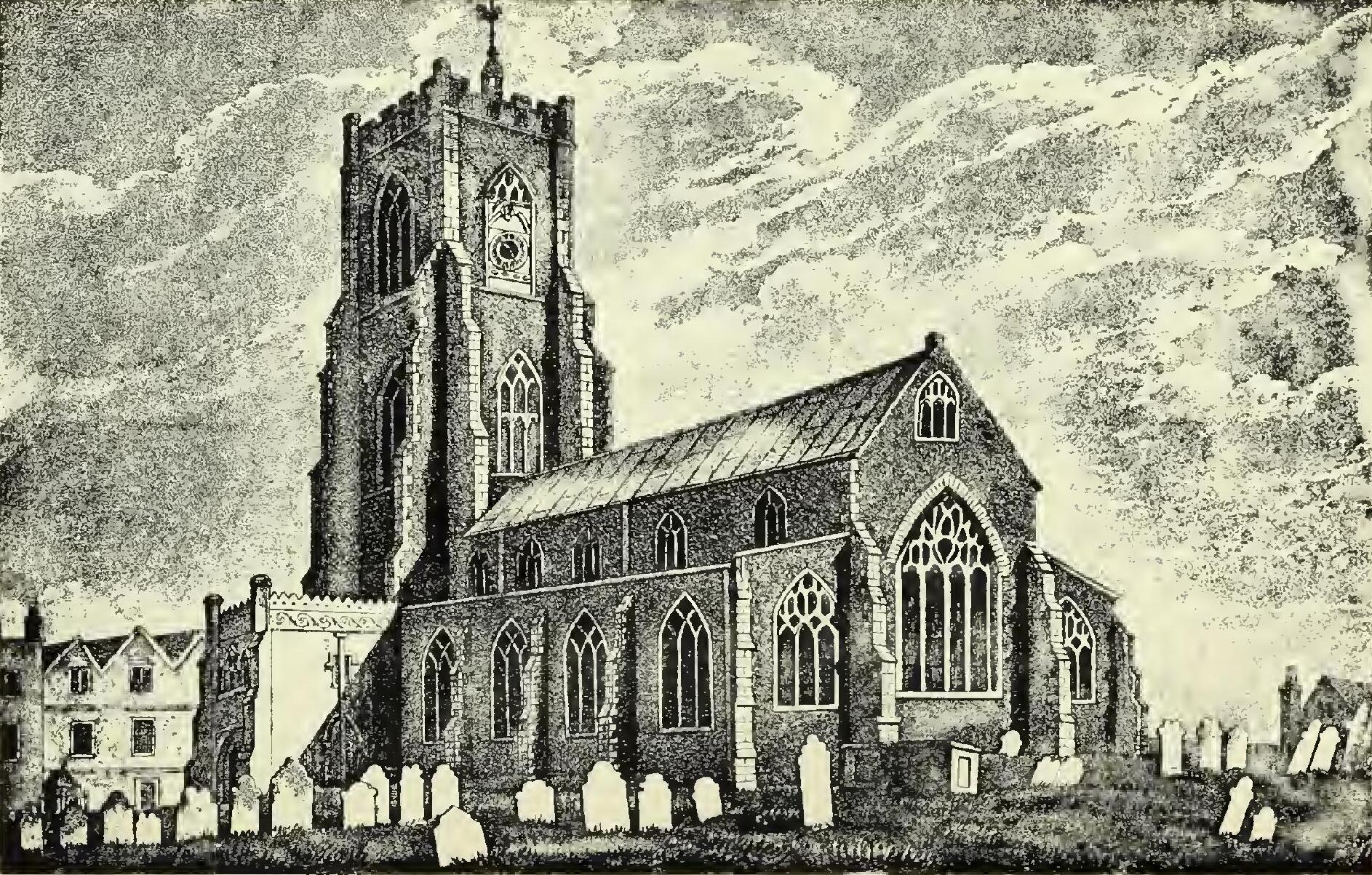
St Giles on the Hill as depicted before the 1866 chancel reconstruction

In the early 19th century, the roof fell into a poor condition; some parishioners sat under umbrellas in the church to keep dry. In the 1851 religious census, St Giles was sitting a congregation of 236 people. The chancel was rebuilt in 1866. In 1886, six of the medical staff of the Norfolk and Norwich Hospital, of which there were eight, lived in the parish of St Giles, as well as eight further physicians and surgeons. St Giles became a Grade I listed building in 1954. A brick burial vault was found at the church in 2004 during digging for service trenches. This dates to the 18th or 19th century, and contained three coffins containing two adults and a juvenile.

== Architecture ==
Very little is known of the form of the original church as it stood by 1140, though it was likely small and made of stone. The present church, mostly of around 1400, is mostly in a Perpendicular style. It is constructed largely with knapped flints and has a nave and chancel, north and south aisles, south porch, and a west tower. Around the outside of the church, there are large gargoyles.

=== Nave ===
In 1385, one Stephen of Holt bequeathed 30s to the church to improve the nave; this may have been a major project and may have involved the prior nave being demolished and the new one built in its place, with Pope Boniface IX (possibly motivated by a petition from Bishop Henry le Despenser) issuing an indulgence to those making contributions to work on the church in 1401.

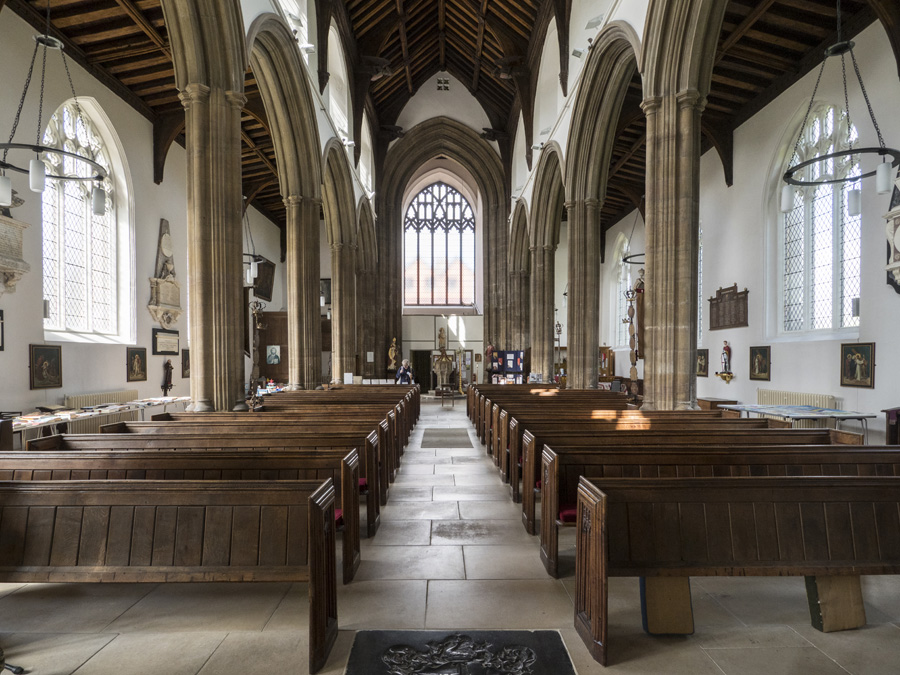
The interior of the west end of St Giles on the Hill

Subject to significant Victorian restoration, the present nave has a knapped black flint exterior, though no ashlar string courses, no plinth and no dado. The main nave windows are Perpendicular and three-light. On the north side of the nave, the arch heads to these windows feature voussoirs which alternate between flint and brick. Inside, the nave is arcaded in five bays; it has tall and thin asymmetrical lozenge piers, made up of four shafts that have smaller mouldings between them. Upon these sit high arches, in turn supporting the five clerestory windows, which are three-light. Though somewhat large, these windows are small compared to those in St Peter Mancroft or St Stephen's. Stained glass within them features the arms of the Scales, Thorpe, Felbrigg and Clifton families. The arms of Sir Thomas Erpingham could also be seen by John Kirkpatrick in the early 18th century. The nave buttresses feature plinths and ashlar quoins. There is a false hammerbeam roof over the nave, made up of four arched braces which create a pointed arch. At the height of the wall-plate, on the hammers, this includes carved angels which hold the shields of members of the royal family from England and France, likely including that of Catherine of Lancaster, Blanche of England, Philippa of England, Thomas, Duke of Clarence, Humphrey, Duke of Gloucester, Catherine of Valois, and either Henry V or Henry VI. This work may have been present in anticipation of a potential progress of the King in 1421 during which he was to visit Norwich, which never came to pass, or in celebration of St Giles' Day. The chancel arch is surrounded by niches; two of the images within these have been restored; these lower ones depict Saint Giles, and a Madonna.

=== South porch ===
Instead of flint, the 15th-century two-storey south porch is faced with ashlar. Over the door's outer arch is a square hood which has shields in its spandrels, and just above this there is a modern depiction of St Giles in a niche alongside arrows, deer, and a crozier. Above this is a Tudor window flanked by further canopied figure niches. The porch has a frieze which shows a running vine, as well as instances of the crowned letter G, for Giles. Above Further ashlar work decorates the buttresses. The porch interior features a fan-vaulted ceiling, which is not seen anywhere else in Norwich. Originally, the parvise had been a chapel to Saint Christopher.

=== West tower ===
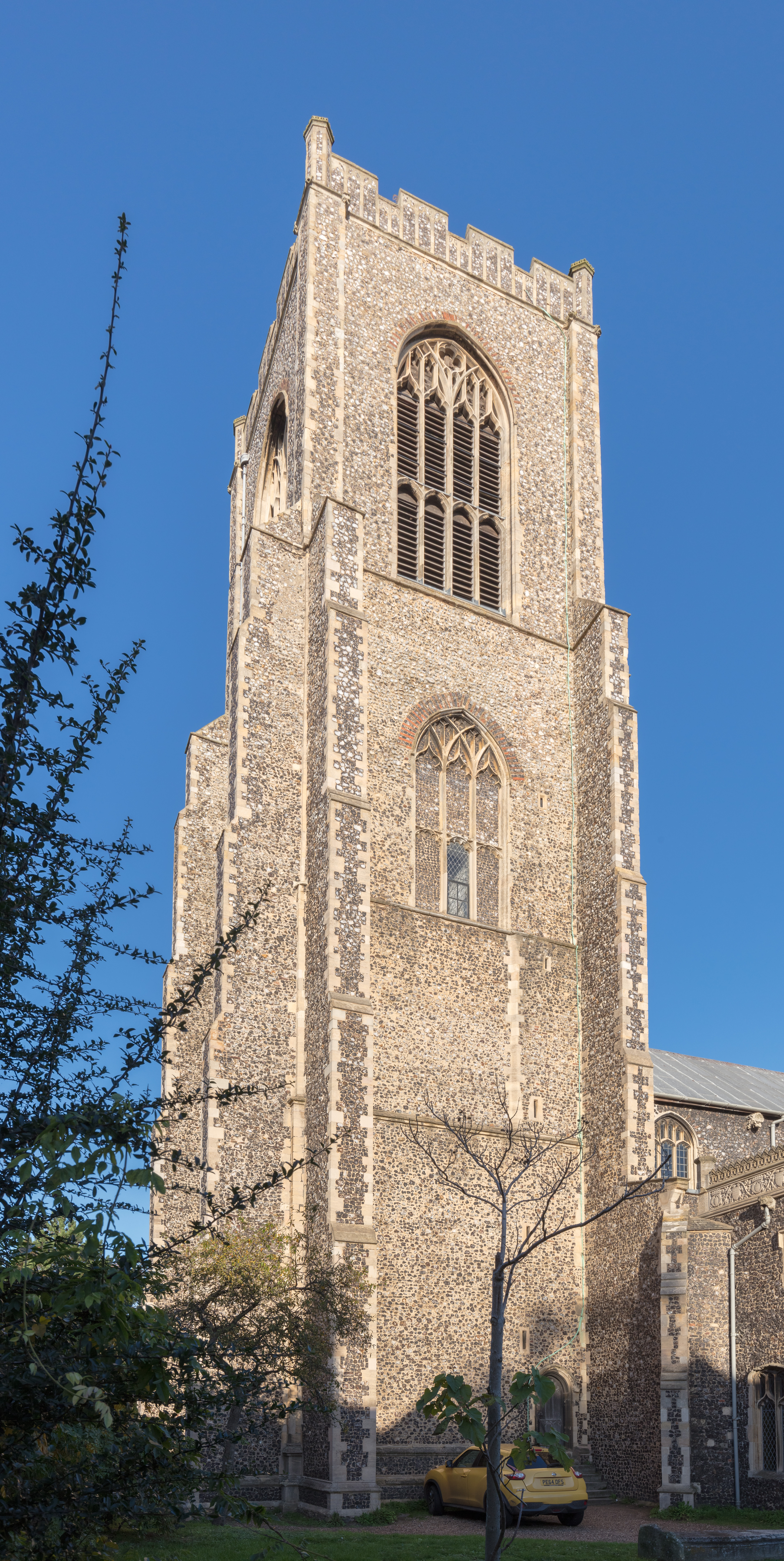
St Giles on the Hill has the tallest church tower in Norwich

The church has the tallest parish church tower in Norwich, at a height of 113 feet (34 m). It is of four stages. There was a bequest of £5 toward the tower in 1424, from Robert Dunston, which lines up with the date of completion of the tower's three lower stages. The buttresses for these tower stages are setback. The lower west side of the tower has a very large five-light west window, below which is a west door featuring traceried figure niches to the left and right. Inside, there is a tower arch from the nave; above this, there are four quatrefoil openings which operates as a sanctus bell window. There is a set of windows on the third stage of the tower; they are large and three-light, though are largely blocked with flint apart from their centre lower lights. On this stage is the ringing chamber.

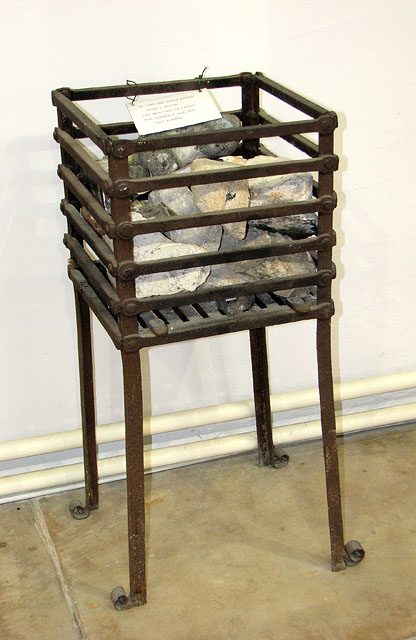
The 1549 beacon cage which was atop the tower until 1737

The belfry stage of the tower might not have been fully constructed until the mid-1440s, though four stages were always intended. There is another set of belfry windows on this upper stage; they are very large and are four-light, and have Perpendicular tracery and cusped transoms. The buttresses on the upper stage clasp the tower. The parapet is crenellated, and features flushwork, also including small turrets in the corners. Inside the tower are eight bells, dating to as early as 1430, and fully added to the tower by 1457. The bells are tenor 13-3-21 cwt. In 1549, the year of the Norfolk Rising and Kett's Rebellion, a beacon was placed atop the tower. Likely acting as a warning beacon, the iron basket which would have held the fire was replaced by the current cupola in 1737, though the basket can still be viewed inside the church. In 1970, an electric light replaced the beacon.

=== Chancel ===
Measuring 35.0 feet (10.67 m) in length in the 15th century, the chancel of the church was demolished in 1581 due to an order from the church's patrons and its dean and chapter because the cost of its upkeep proved too expensive. As a result, the chancel arch was blocked up and the Perpendicular east window was placed there. The church did not have a chancel for nearly three centuries. Then, in 1866, vicar William Ripley paid for the construction of a new, shorter chancel; RM Phipson designed it in a Decorated style. Some of the materials from the reconstruction of the chancel were taken to be used in the Plantation Garden. The new chancel, of three bays, has an arch-braced roof. The east window features art designed by Phipson. It is now 35.1 feet (10.71 m) in length.

== Furnishings ==
The church's font was damaged during the church's 1866 restoration; as a result, only the bowl and part of the pedestal are original, of the 15th century. These are carved with shields and flowers. There are effigies of the saints Gregory and Laurence, brought to the church from other churches that have been made redundant.

Former box pews in the church, and its west gallery, were removed in 1866. There were also benches in the side aisles which were removed in 1936. The benches in the nave were reconfigured to be movable in 2008. There are five stands for maces on the ends of the pews in St Giles's; these were for past mayors of Norwich who also lived in St Giles's parish in the 18th and 19th centuries. The stands feature the mayors' coats of arms.

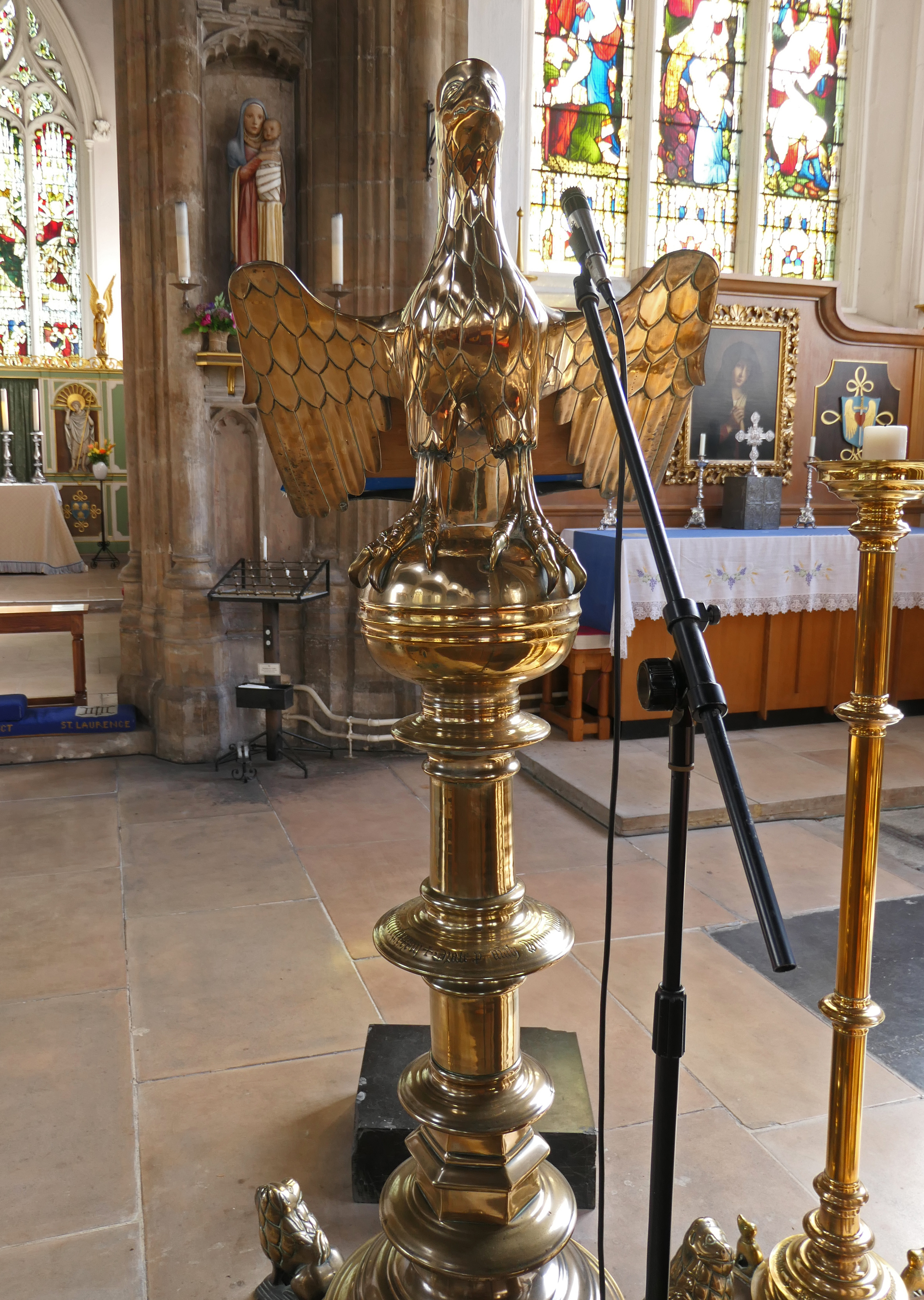
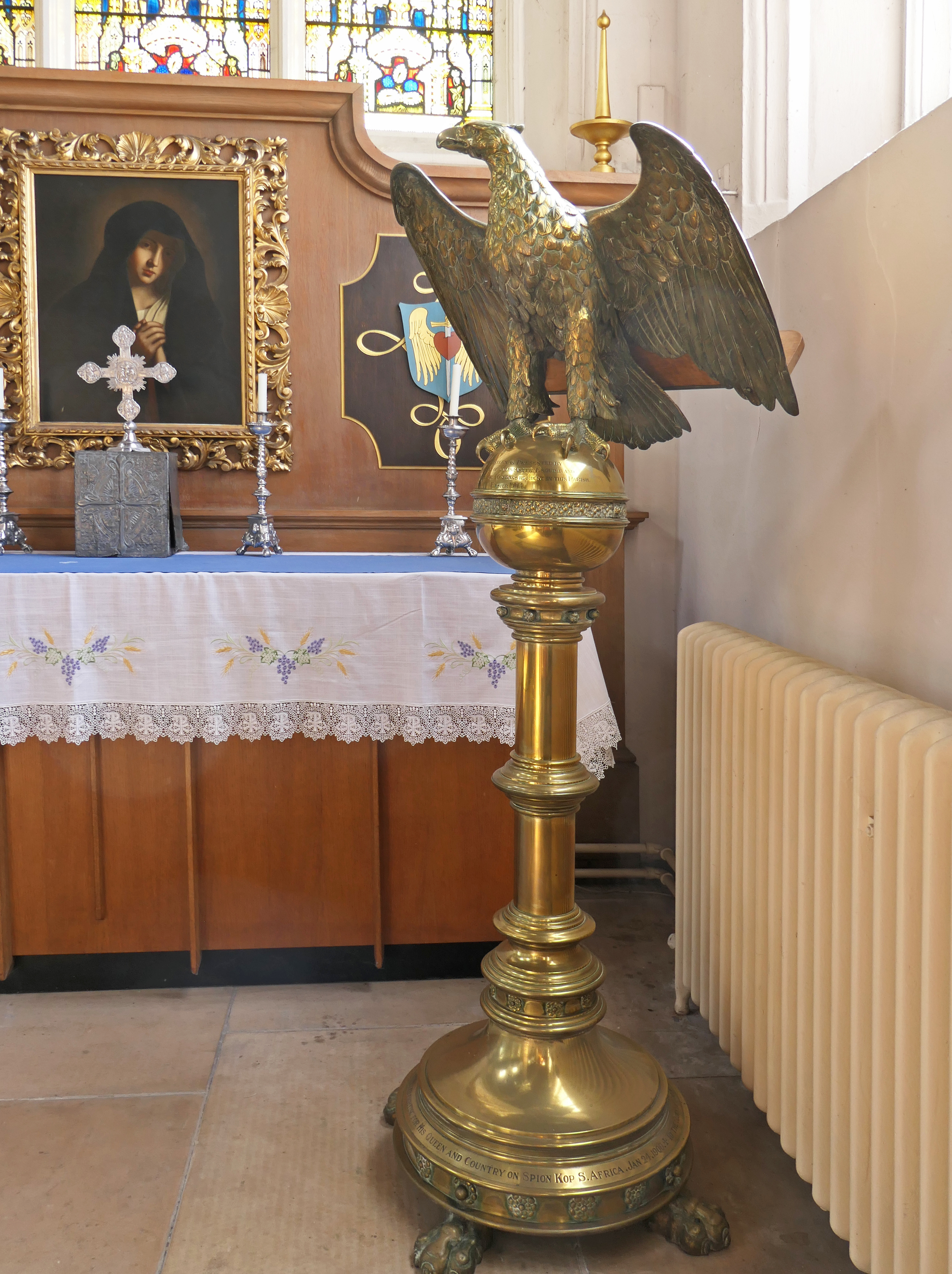
St Giles on the Hill has two eagle lecterns; one dating to 1493 (left), the other to 1903 (right).

The church has two brass eagle lecterns. One of these dates to 1493 according to its inscription, which asks for prayers for William Westbrook and Rose and Joan, his wives. It is likely East Anglian make, if not made in Norwich itself. It is similar to the eagle lectern at Oxborough. The lectern resided in St Michael Coslany until 1776 when it was brought to St Gregory's, and it later came to St Giles's. The other is from 1903.

There is a chest carved in a classical style in the church, upon which is the portrait bust of Sir Thomas Churchman (d. 1781), who was a sheriff and a mayor of Norwich in 1757 and 1761 respectively. Another altar depicts a crowned Madonna and child. There is also a set of Queen Anne royal arms, dating to 1708.

The church contained an organ which dated from 1896 by Norman and Beard. There is a reredos which is a memorial to the vicar of the church who was active from 1927 to 1933; Richard Courtier-Foster. First built in 1957, it was brought forward from the east wall in 2007, creating a sacristy behind it.

=== Monuments ===
There is a monumental brass to Robert Baxter (d. 1432) and his wife Christiana Baxter, and another to Richard Purdaunce (d. 1436) and his wife Margaret on the floor of the nave. Both were likely commissioned by the men's widows, with Margaret living over 40 years longer than her husband. There is a chalice brass to John Smyth (1499) which is in front of the altar in the south chapel. There is also an inscription brass in front of the altar in the north chapel to Elizabetha Bedingfold (1637). It reads:

My name speakes what I was and am and have
A Bedding Field a peece of earth a grave
Where I expect vntill my sovle shall bring
Vnto the field an everlasting spring
For rayse and rayse ovt of the earth & slime
God did the first and will the second time obiit Die Maii 1637.

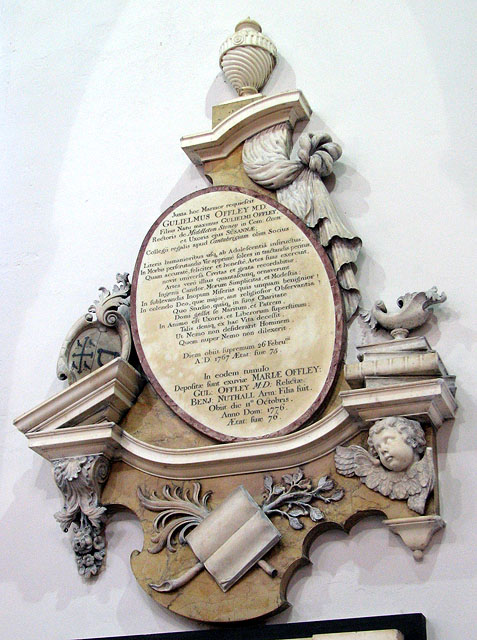
The rococo-style wall monument to medical doctor William Offley

There are many wall monuments in the church, which were rearranged in 1866, as well as ledger stones. There are wall monuments to:

- Adrian Payne (d. 1676);
- Thomas Churchman (d. 1742) and wife Deborah by Sir Henry Cheere, 1st Baronet;
- Philip Stannard (d. 1747) by Thomas Rawlins;
- William Offley M.D. (d. 1767) in a rococo style, maker unknown (north aisle, east end);
- Sir Thomas Churchman (d. 1781) by Thomas Rawlins.

== Location ==
The church is located on the highest ground within the city at 85 feet (26 m) above sea level. This site was on the far west of the French Borough, and was west of the Little Cockey which flowed north to the River Wensum. St Giles Street's junction with Bethel Street is to the south of the church. The churchyard was formerly around 1 acre (0.40 ha), though buildings to the north likely encroached on this area and so the present churchyard now spans 0.8 acres (0.32 ha).

The parish boundary of St Giles mostly does not follow the line of the Little Cockey, though does so somewhat at the north end of St Giles Hill when it comes near the street Pottergate. The boundary narrows toward the east, taking up the width of only one tenement on each side of St Giles Street, with the northern side of this likely influenced by the topography of the hill slope. Following the boundary's south-eastern side, it cuts straight across Chapelfield Gardens. The full western parish boundary is formed by the city wall, and the parish does not extend past the St Giles Gate.
