= St Peter Mancroft =

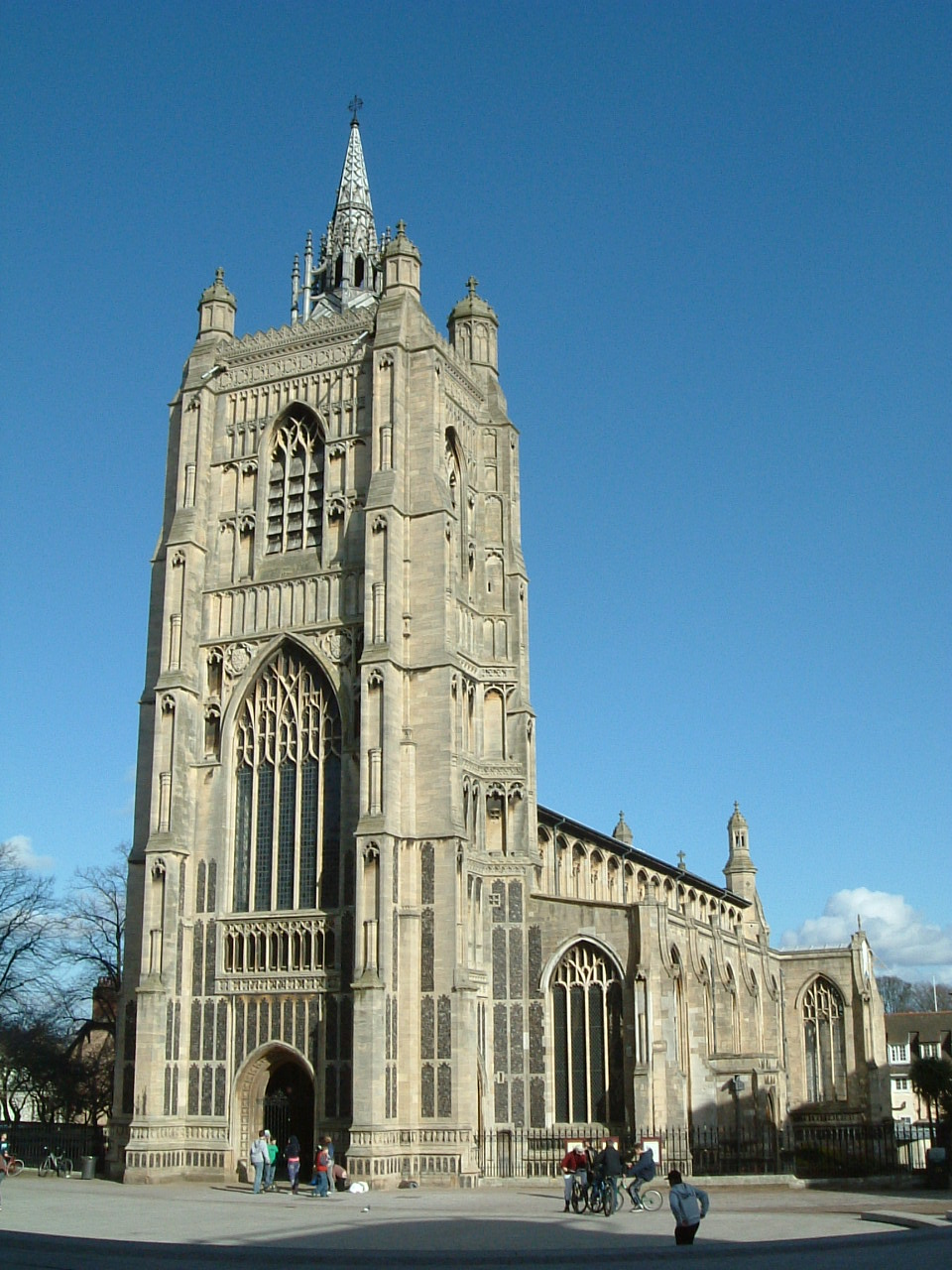
- St Peter Mancroft from the west in 2006
- St Peter Mancroft
- 52°37′40″N 1°17′33″E
- OS grid reference: TG 22932 08426
- Country: England
- Denomination: Church of England
- Churchmanship: Central
- Website: stpetermancroft.org.uk

History
- Status: Church
- Founded: c. 1070
- Dedication: Saint Peter

Architecture
- Functional status: Active
- Heritage designation: Grade I listed building
- Designated: 26 February 1954
- Style: Perpendicular Gothic
- Years built: 1430–65

Administration
- Province: Canterbury
- Diocese: Norwich
- Parish: Norwich, St Peter Mancroft

Clergy
- Vicar: Edward Carter

St Peter Mancroft is the largest parish church in the city of Norwich, Norfolk. A Grade I listed building in a Perpendicular Gothic style, it is located on an elevated position by Norwich Market in the city centre and operates as part of the Church of England.

The church was established in c. 1070, following the Norman Conquest, by Ralph de Gael, the Earl of East Anglia. With an intention to express Norman power over the city, It was positioned to be central to the French Borough, a then-new urban quarter for the Bretons who came to Norwich after the Conquest. In 1075 after a failed rebellion by de Gael, William the Conqueror took over ownership of the church, allowing it to be administered by Roger Bigod and his priest Wala until Gloucester Abbey gained ownership in 1086 or 1087.

Norwich's College of St Mary in the Fields gained St Peter Mancroft's benefice in the 1380s, and subsequently the church was rebuilt entirely between 1430 and 1465 in a Perpendicular Gothic style; much of this construction remains today. Notable parishioners include physician and author Sir Thomas Browne, who was buried in the chancel in 1682. On 2 May 1715, the church recorded that bell-ringers rang what may be the world's first true peal with over 5,000 changes on 13 bells. There were 19th-century architectural additions such as the tower parapet with its pinnacles and an 1895 flèche. The Forum is now situated nearby.

== Dedication and naming ==
St Peter Mancroft is dedicated to Saint Peter only; The earliest evidence of a dedication to a prince of the apostles comes from a charter issued by King Henry I (r. 1100–1119), describing it as "the church of St Peter which is in the market". While some historians state that the church had an unofficial dual dedication to Saint Paul, supported by carved stone shields from the late Middle Ages over the west door which depict crossed keys for Peter and crossed swords for Paul, this was conventional during this time and is not direct evidence of the church being dedicated to both saints. Wills and inventories of the church do not evidence the presence of imagery or ornaments related to Paul.

References to "St Peter of Mancroft" do not appear until the early 13th century. The toponym 'Mancroft' likely derives from the Old English germane croft meaning 'common field', 'common land', or 'common enclosure', though it is also frequently said to have been derived from the Latin magna crofta meaning 'great field'. Both of these names reference the field which once lay to the south of the church; the college known as St Mary in the Field, on which Assembly House now stands, was also named after this field.

== History ==
=== 1070–1388: Founding and early ownership changes ===
Between 1069 and 1075, c. 1070, the church was founded by Ralph de Gael, the powerful Earl of East Anglia, in the first decade of England's Norman rule. This founding took place during a period in which William the Conqueror and the papacy were political allies, prior to attempts by Pope Gregory VII to assert authority in England. The church's positioning was prominent in the marketplace of the French Borough, a new urban quarter built to accommodate the Bretons who came with de Gael to England in 1066; St Peter Mancroft was thus placed to express Norman power over the city. In relation to the French Borough, St Peter Mancroft was initially referred to only as 'a certain church'.

In the late 11th century, the church changed hands twice; from Ralph de Gael to William the Conqueror following a failed rebellion by de Gael in 1075, during which time it was administered by the King's deputy and sheriff Roger Bigod and Bigod's priest Wala, and then to Gloucester Abbey in 1086 or 1087 as the abbey was a favoured institution of William, also being dedicated to Saint Peter. It is possible that Wala himself remained a priest at the church, serving on behalf of the abbey. Within a century of its foundation, the church was already a major building in the city. In 1254, a valuation given for a taxation was £8 13s 4d, of which £3 6s 8d went to Gloucester and the remainder went to the incumbent. This evidences that Mancroft was the richest parish church in Norwich at the time. The church's total valuation rose to £20 13s 4d by 1291. The church valuation remained at its 1291 level in 1368, when the archdeacon inspected the church and found that a large number of items for the celebration of the liturgy, especially for celebrating the eucharist.

=== 1388–1581: Transfer to St Mary in the Fields, rebuilding, and Kett's Day ===
The church's benefice remained under the Abbey until 1388, when the College of St Mary in the Fields, in Norwich, appropriated it. This entailed the payment of 40 marks, or £26 13s 4d, to the crown for a license to do so. The College was partially within the parish of St Peter Mancroft, and was gaining an expanded role in Norwich’s religious and civic life with support from Bishop of Norwich Henry le Despenser. Due to a 1380 royal charter which gave more power to the city's bailiffs and aldermen, they were able to appropriate St Peter Mancroft's rectorial revenues with Gloucester retaining some of this income, and the church was served by chaplains. During the Late Middle Ages, there was almost certainly a song school at the church, intended to teach reading and writing.

The present building results from a major rebuilding from 1430 on the site of an existing church. This rebuilding took place when St Peter Mancroft was the wealthiest parish in the city. It was part of a wider building campaign on almost every Norwich church, fuelled by an upswing of 15th-century investment. Bequests for this mid-15th-century construction seem to have been given to a group of parishioners, suggesting that they were overseeing the rebuilding rather than the clergy. The new church was consecrated in 1455. During this time, the recently developed cult of the Name of Jesus was popular among the mercantile class in Norwich, who made up the congregation in St Peter Mancroft.

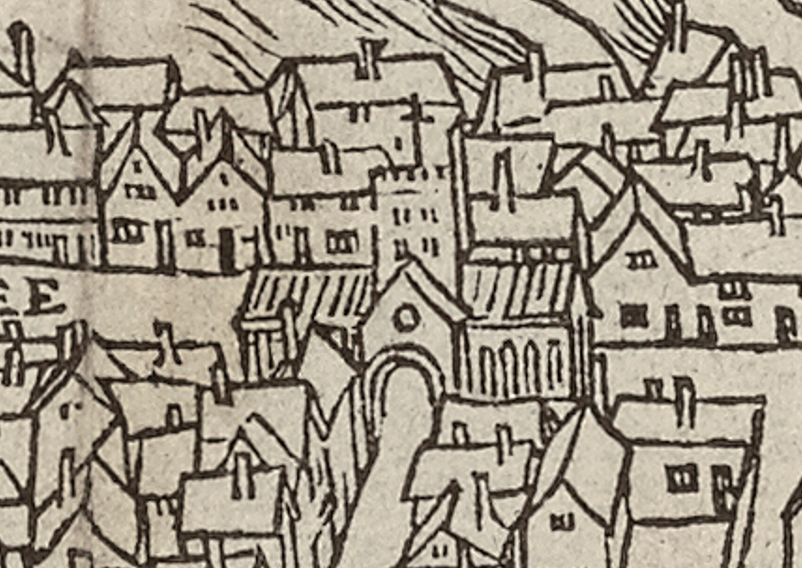
St Peter Mancroft on William Cuningham's prospect of Norwich in 1558

Following the defeat of Kett's Rebellion in 1549, a service of thanksgiving was held at St Peter Mancroft. The Earl of Warwick attended the service after putting down the rebellion at the battle of Dussindale. This service continued annually for over a century, on the 27 August anniversary of the battle which became known as Kett's Day. The church is present on William Cuningham's 1558 prospect of Norwich, with what is now known as Bethel Street running up to its tower entrance. In 1564, John Walker became St Peter Mancroft's senior minister; a Puritan Protestant, alongside other new clerical leaders, he may have led the practice of prophesying in the city with Bishop Pankhurst's encouragement. A later survey of Norwich by Samuel King in 1766 noted that White Swan Lane was the street that ran to the church's entrance, calling the depiction on Cuningham's prospect into question.

=== 1581–1745: Feoffee transfer ===
In 1581, the church's benefice was appropriated when it was sold by the crown and bought by a feoffee acting on behalf of the church's parishioners. As such, representatives of the church's congregation from this point became responsible for picking the church's ministers.

John Whitefoot delivered a funeral sermon at the church in honour of Bishop of Norwich Joseph Hall on 30 September 1656, and this was later published in London as Death's Alarum in 1658. By 1682, there was a parochial library above the north porch of the church which was large enough that it warranted the purchase of "A booke to make a catalogue of ye bookes in ye library". By the 1740s, historian Francis Blomefield only referred to the "remains of the library". When news of the Jacobite rising of 1745 reached Norwich, the vestry of St Peter Mancroft made the decision that the church would not ring its bells, in opposition to the rising.

=== 1818–present: Listed status and art installations ===
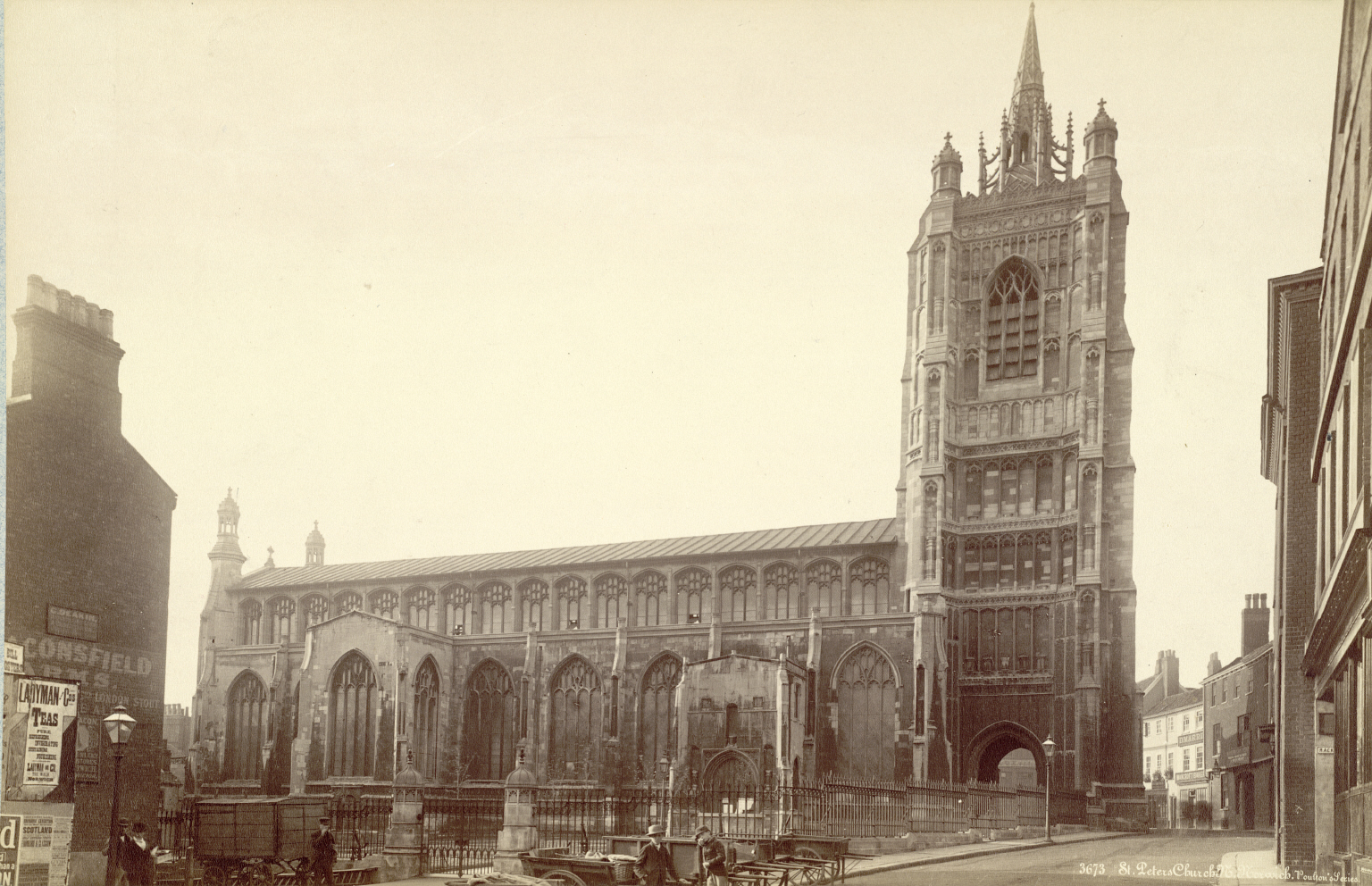
St Peter Mancroft from the north in 1865

By 1818, the school at St Peter Mancroft was led by the Norfolk and Norwich National Society. The 1851 religious census found that St Peter Mancroft was seeing adult morning congregations of 700 people. The church became a Grade I listed building on 26 February 1954.

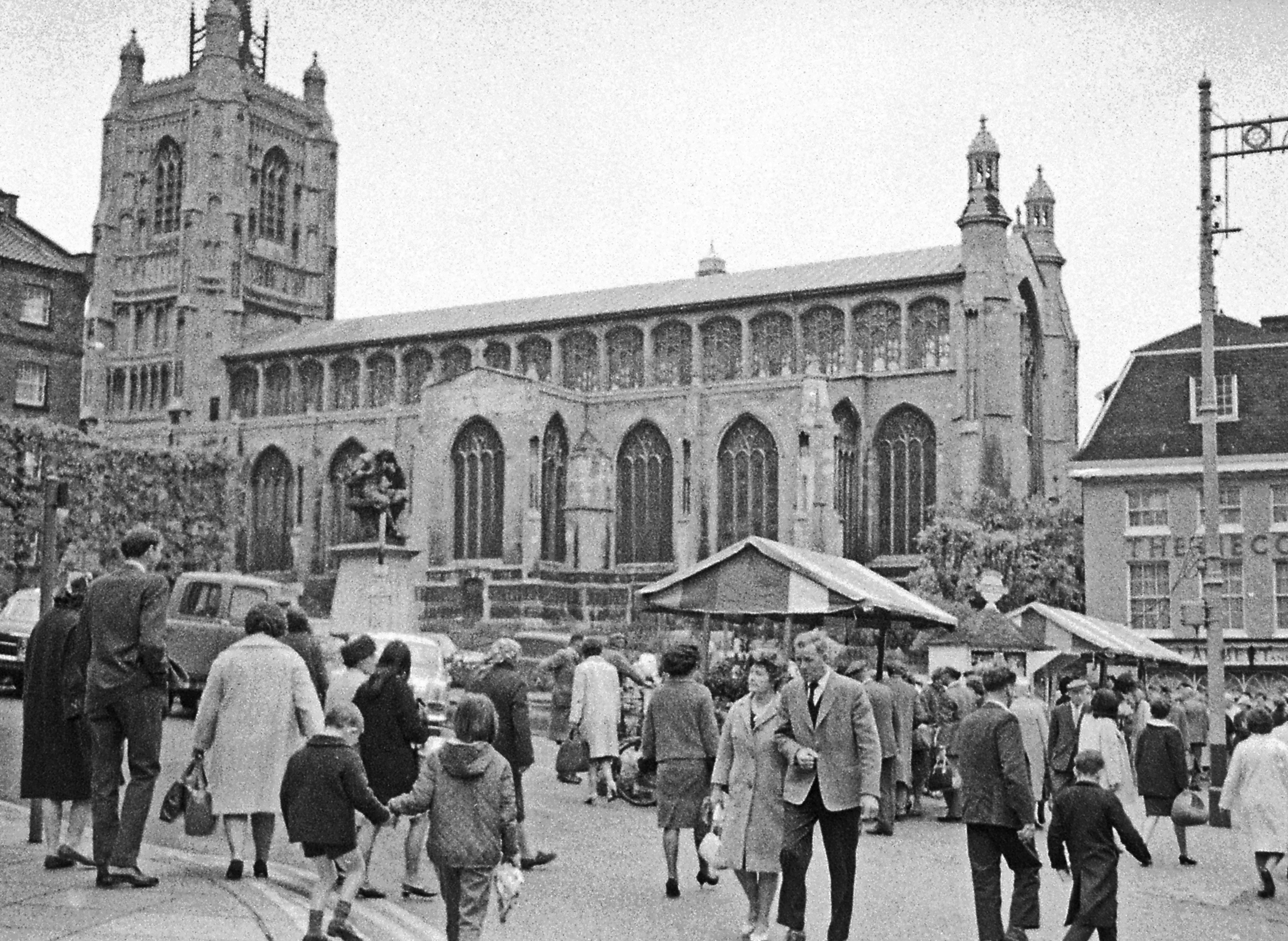
St Peter Mancroft from Hay Hill to its south in 1966

Sculptor Charles Gurrey created a sculpture for the church in 1990, titled the Beveridge Memorial Cross and , in memory of John Beveridge, a 25-year-old parishioner of St Peter Mancroft who had committed suicide in 1988. A cross moulded from wax and then cast in bronze, it was mounted onto the east wall of the south chapel where it caught the sunlight in the church, slowly changing its shape over time. In 2014, as part of Norfolk and Norwich Festival, a 22-metre (72 ft) "cardboard church" was constructed by 200 volunteers on the steps of The Forum opposite, emulating the real church's tower. Titled the People's Tower and designed by French artist Olivier Grossetête, it consisted of 1,000 cardboard boxes and over eight miles (13 km) of packing tape. Marking the centenary of the end of World War I, 15,500 handmade poppies were displayed at the church, each representing an individual named on a Norfolk war memorial.

Archaeological excavation was done in 2018, revealing a 12th-century nave aisle and transept on the south side of the building, in the form of two limestone bases. The Luke Jerram artwork Gaia, a sculpture of planet Earth, was placed in the church in 2021. In March 2024, 48 solar panels, heat source pumps, batteries and LED lighting were installed on the church as part of net-zero plans by the Church of England. Bishop of Norwich Graham Usher inspected the works on the roof in October alongside the church verger, canon Edward Carter and a BBC reporter; they were reported to Norfolk Constabulary by a bystander who falsely believed they were "suspicious youths". In June 2025, an art exhibit called HIDDEN, in the form of a 6-square-metre (65 sq ft) illuminated cube by sculptor Peter Walker was placed in the church.

== Architecture ==
=== Original building ===
No foundation-era fabric of the building has yet been discovered, though it likely had a single-vessel nave, a similarly single-vessel chancel, two transept arms, a Lady chapel, and a tower by the late 14th century. It was built of stone from the beginning, unlike many of the Anglo-Scandinavian churches in the city. It was likely cruciform with a central tower, which would have split the chancel and nave. The south nave aisle is the first known renovation to the original church in about 1200, making use of Alwalton marble, and this may have been accompanied by an extension to the chancel and/or expansion of the crossing arches around the same time. After expansion with one or two nave aisles and a north chancel chapel, the chancel's exterior width was about equal to that of the interior width of the main sections of the present church at about 23 feet (7.0 m). The chancel saw work in 1393, and during this time in the late 14th century the original central tower to the church was demolished, leaving a gap between the nave and chancel.

=== Rebuilding ===
A major rebuilding of the church began in 1430, though the west tower was built from the early 1390s. In 1445, Robert Pert donated £20 to the church for a new gable at its east end, giving this money to the parishioners rather than the clergy. Ayers et al have argued that the architectural changes made to the church after 1380 were "a physical manifestation of wealth and self-conscious aggrandisement at the centre of civic and commercial life." Historians disagree on the pace of the rebuilding. Carole Rawcliffe and Richard Wilson argue that it took place in "a series of short campaigns"; they note that the chancel's floor level is mismatched with that of the eastern arcade base floor level, surmising from this that the exact architecture of the rest of the church was not yet planned at this time. Similarly, Francis Woodman argued that the rebuilding took place 'in fits and starts'. In contrast, Zachary Stewart argued that a coherent vision from 1440 was carried out and completed around 1465 with few amendments to this original plan.

Following the main campaign, there was a series of less protracted building campaigns which progressed from the east to the west tower. At the end of this in 1479, 40s was left for leading the church, and work on the tower kept going into the first decade of the 16th century; at some point, it was joined with the rest of the church.

=== Present building ===
St Peter Mancroft from Norwich Castle, to the east

The present church is the largest and grandest parish church in the city, being 180 feet (55 m) long, and is in the Perpendicular Gothic style. A significant amount of its appearance has not been altered since the church's 15th-century rebuilding; a rare occurrence. Zachary Stewart has put forward that St Peter Mancroft is one of a handful of churches in this style that are "essentially cathedrals in miniature." It features a nave and chancel and a west tower, as well as north and south aisles, transepts, and porches, and a three-storey east vestry. The whole church is faced with freestone ashlar, indicating that the parish was wealthy enough to add this decorative cladding. There is a continuous flushwork base-frieze around the church which features stone shields. The roofs are lead.

==== West tower ====
The construction of the present west tower from the early 1390s was spurred by the church's transfer to St Mary in the Fields. It possibly began as a free-standing structure; it would have straddled the churchyard's western boundary, similarly to St John Maddermarket at present.

It is of three stages, though the setback buttresses rise in five stages. The tower itself is elaborate. Almost the entire tower is covered by panelling, niches or flushwork, though the niches have likely never been occupied. On the west, north and south sides, the ground floor of the tower has openings; this allows a processional way, though the east opening has been blocked by a coffee bar, constructed in 1983. Past these openings, there is a west door from the tower to the nave and chancel. Inside is a tierceron vault which centrally includes a bell-hoist hole. The tower arch is tall. There is a perpendicular 5-light west window in the tower, and above this there are three-light belfry windows which have two-centre arches. The tower has a parapet and pepperpot-shaped polygonal pinnacles on its corners. In 1896, a small lead-covered flèche with flying buttresses was added, designed by A. E. Street.

==== Nave, chancel and aisles ====
The interior of the church in 2020

A bequest was made to the construction of the clerestory in 1431. In c. 1440–45, a new north chancel chapel was added to the old church, and just following the commencement of this, St Mary in the Fields donated the church's profits from a full year for the chancel to be rebuilt. Within this specific building campaign, work was done to newly rebuild the eastern end of the church, the south chapel, and the south and possibly north transepts. The detailing across these is architecturally consistent. The chancel was complete by 1455. Either at the same time as this, or afterward, the nave and aisles of the church were rebuilt.

The nave and chancel form a single vessel; there is no chancel arch. There are 17 windows on each side of the clerestory, separated by very slim pillars for the period, which runs along the entire nave and chancel.

St Peter Mancroft's hammerbeam roof has timber vaulting.

The nave is six bays in length. The windows in these bays are four-light and have two-centre arches. The interior of the nave features tall arcades on slim piers; these are made up of clusters of four shafts with small, hollow diagonals. These form double-order two-centre arches. The nave roof is hammerbeam, though these are hidden behind a timber ceiling of vaulting, The roof rests on long wall posts upon stone corbels between the clerestory windows, each of which have different heads. It is one of five church roofs in the city that feature depictions of angels.

The chancel is of three bays in length, and its windows are three-light. Beneath the church's chancel at the east end, there is a passageway. The east window is seven-light; it saw repair in 1648. Either side are polygonal corner turrets. In 1850, two L-shaped trenches accommodating a number of acoustic jars were discovered beneath the wooden floor on which the choir stalls had previously stood. The earthenware jars were built into its walls at intervals of about three feet, with the mouths facing into the trenches.

The church has buttresses along its aisles. These are ornate and feature tall and canopied niches at their central stage as well as pinnacles on top. The aisle roofs are arch-braced and feature carved spandrels. The east windows in both aisles feature Yorkshire Ogee tracery. At the east end of these aisles, the north chancel chapel was dedicated to Saint John the Baptist, and the south chancel chapel was assumedly the church's Lady chapel.

==== Other features ====
The north porch, which faces the market, has two storeys, and features a shafted doorway that has a niche above it as well as interior lierne vaulting. It is more complex than the south porch, which is only one story.

The church's transepts are single-bay, and are buttressed. The north transept chapel which was dedicated to Saint Nicholas and since 1982 has been a treasury. Beneath the north transept is a brick undercroft.

== Stained glass ==
St Peter Mancroft's east window retains much of the church's medieval glass.

The church contains a significant amount of medieval stained glass, though this is significantly reduced from the original amount, and none of the glass is in situ, having been relocated on a number of occasions. In the present day, the remains of at least ten church windows are still in the church. Rawcliffe and Wilson have called this glass "of national and international significance" for its quality, informative value, and as an example of glazing in a high-status context. At present, according to Mortlock and Roberts, the east chancel window is the best-surviving example of the 15th and 16th-century Norwich school of glass painters, featuring the largest collection of stained glass in Norwich at 42 panels. These contain stories of Christ, Mary, Saint Peter, and John the Evangelist.

=== 15th century: John Wighton workshop ===
Many panels now in the eastern arm of the church were also glazed by the John Wighton workshop in the decade from 1445. Nearly all of the surviving panels from the John Wighton workshop are now in the east chancel window, although none are originally from there.

The 15th-century glass originating from the second-most eastward south window is defined by a singular style. One of these depict the Franciscan suffragan bishop Robert Ringman (d. 1435), the likely donor to this window. Other panels in this style and thus from the same window include tracery panels depicting the Annunciation and the Visitation, as well as main light panels showing Saint Francis, the Saint Elizabeth of Hungary distributing alms, and two scenes depicting moments in the life of Saint Margaret of Antioch. The window may have been painted by Helen Moundford, who was a member of the Wighton company and the only recorded Norwich glazier who was a woman. It features possible allusions to the cults of Saint Margaret and Saint Anne with their relation to childbirth, and the 1453 birth of Prince Edward; his mother Margaret of Anjou had visited Norwich in the same year. All of this glass is now in the east chancel window.

Some of the other glass at St Peter Mancroft, including a panel depicting the Passion of Christ and another showing the Crowning with Thorns and the First Mocking of Christ, making up two scenes related to the Passion, may have been painted by Helen Mundford’s husband, William Mundford. William's work appears to have been less linear, more painterly and with more expressive faces and gestures. The glass was likely paid for by John Bumpsted with a large sum of £10 over four years, earmarked specifically for the north transept's east window. The passion story is now present in the third row from the bottom of the east chancel window. William may have also painted a series of main-light seated saintly women, possibly inspired by Flemish art; two panels of this survive.

==== Toppes window ====
The donor panel of Robert Toppes, who paid for the glass originally in the east window of the north chancel chapel

The Toppes window was created for the east window of the north chancel chapel between 1450 and 1455, consisting of main-light and tracery panels. This was donated by Robert Toppes, a mercer and mayor of the city. The Toppes window was highly likely to have been painted by locally-trained glazier John Mundeford at the John Wighton Workshop. John was the son of William Mundford. Some of the designs for this were also adapted for use at the church at East Harling. Some of its designs depict allusions to the mass of the Name of Jesus, which would have been celebrated in the north chancel chapel. Above a panel depicting Toppes and his wives would have existed panels showing a Marian cycle of the Infancy of Christ followed by the Death, Funeral and the Assumption of Mary and completed with her Coronation. Its tracery included three tiers of panels depicting English sainted kings, bishops and archbishops.

11 panels of the Toppes window survive in the reconfigured east window. These are the ones showing:

- Jesus at the Tomb,
- The Circumcision of Christ,
- The Apostles,
- The Jew arresting the funeral of Virgin Mary, with the Jew shown wearing full armour, bearing the coat of arms of the disgraced royal favourite, William de la Pole, Duke of Suffolk, who had feuded with Norwich.
- Originally from the Toppes window, depictions of the Annunciation (left) and the Visitation (right), the former with a rare depiction of Christ, are now in the second lowest row in the east chancel window.
  The Annunciation (second-lowest row, leftmost panel), including a depiction of Christ in embryo form with a cross on his shoulder, following a dove down a shaft of light. This is a rare depiction of Jesus which was forbidden in the diocese by Bishop Pankhurst in 1561, though this instance appears to have gone unnoticed.
- The Visitation (second-lowest row, second-left panel), with Mary in a gold dress under a blue robe and Elizabeth in a yellow-diapered white dress under a dark red cloak.
- The shepherds visiting the baby Jesus (second-lowest row, third-left panel),
- The Adoration of the Magi (twice),
- The Massacre of the Innocents (second-lowest row, rightmost panel).
- Robert Toppes and his two wives, accompanied by Toppes's family heraldry.

Other material from the John Wighton workshop includes three windows in the south chancel chapel which were made between 1450 and 1455 and relate to Mary, and tracery panel representations of the genealogy of Christ and the Holy Kindred in the east and south-east windows respectively.

=== Later glass ===
Further glass commissioned between c. 1480 and 1500 was in the west window of the John the Evangelist chapel and depicted his life. This glass was given by mayor William London.

Two panels on the bottom left of the east window, depicting donors. In the left panel is Edmund next to Sir Christopher Garnysh, whose head has been replaced with a saint's. In the right panel is Thomas Elys, three-time Mayor of Norwich and MP.

Stained glass which is likely of c. 1526, commemorates the Elys and Garnysh families. This included Thomas Elys, three-time Mayor of Norwich and MP. The panel depicting Edmund and Sir Christopher Garnysh shows them both armed, the latter's head having been later replaced with that of a saint. These now make up two of the four outermost panels on the bottom row of the east chancel window which depict the donors of the windows in the church.

Part of the life of St Peter, who is depicted in a blue robe, is shown across panels in the fourth row from the bottom in the east window. There is other surviving glass which depicts Saint Elizabeth of Hungary giving bread to leprous, blind and lame beggars.

=== Damage and 19th-century movements ===
During the English Civil War, the Great Blow gunpowder explosion destroyed much of the stained glass in the church, but what was left was reconfigured into the main east window. In 1835, seven panels of 15th-century glass from the east window were removed from the church to Felbrigg Hall. One, which has since been returned to the church, depicted the Assumption of the Virgin. John Dixon moved some of the glass in work dating from 1847 to 1841, and further movements were made during the work undertaken by Clayton and Bell in 1881. Seven 19th-century panels exist in the east window, positioned in its centre light and bottom row. The stained glass was removed for the duration of World War II; the 1947 reinstallation of the windows by Messrs G King and Son involved rearranging and re-leading the tracery lights. The lower west window of the church, above its entrance, houses stained glass by Andrew Anderson. It is themed according to Johann Sebastian Bach's Sleepers Awake, depicting angels descending on the 13 bells of the tower.

== Fittings ==
Prior to the Reformation, there was a large rood screen which spanned the church's width, and the steps that existed to this screen are still visible in the present day. There is a reredos positioned below the east window which is from the 1880s, with later additions of a Christ in Glory and saints Augustine, Columba, Felix, and Alban by Sir Ninian Comper in 1930.

=== Font ===
The font of St Peter Mancroft, and its rare canopy

The church's baptismal font survives from its medieval era, and is one of its most notable attractions. It has an octagonal stone bowl dated to c. 1465, and a large and detailed wooden canopy or 'baptistery' dated to the 1520s. John Causton, under the alias of a grocer named John Julian, left 10 marks (£6 13s 4d) in 1463, likely motivating the church authorities to commission it. The bowl originally bore images of the seven sacraments as well as several figures, likely being almost as detailed as the other Norwich font depicting the sacraments from St Mary in the Marsh, but the St Peter Mancroft bowl was a severe victim of iconoclasm and much of it is effaced.

The canopy, from the 15th century, is rare in form. It is octagonal in its upper sections, alluding to similarly octagonal Early Christian baptisteries in Italy. The main structure is crocketed. This rests atop four square columns like a ciborium.

=== Bells ===
The church is known for its bells and its bell-ringers, with 14 bells and a ring of tenor 37-3-15 cwt. In about 1568, a bell was gifted to the church by Sir Peter Reade, and this benefaction is noted in a memorial panel of about 1646 which includes a depiction of the bell. In 1715, John Garthon and a group named the Norwich Scholars rang a peal, changing the order of the ringing over 5,000 times, which was recorded on 2 May. It is stated by the church that this was the first true peal to have been rung worldwide; a plaque in St Peter Mancroft commemorates this. As of 1991, those at the church had performed a peal of 12 bells with 5,040 changes.

=== Organs ===
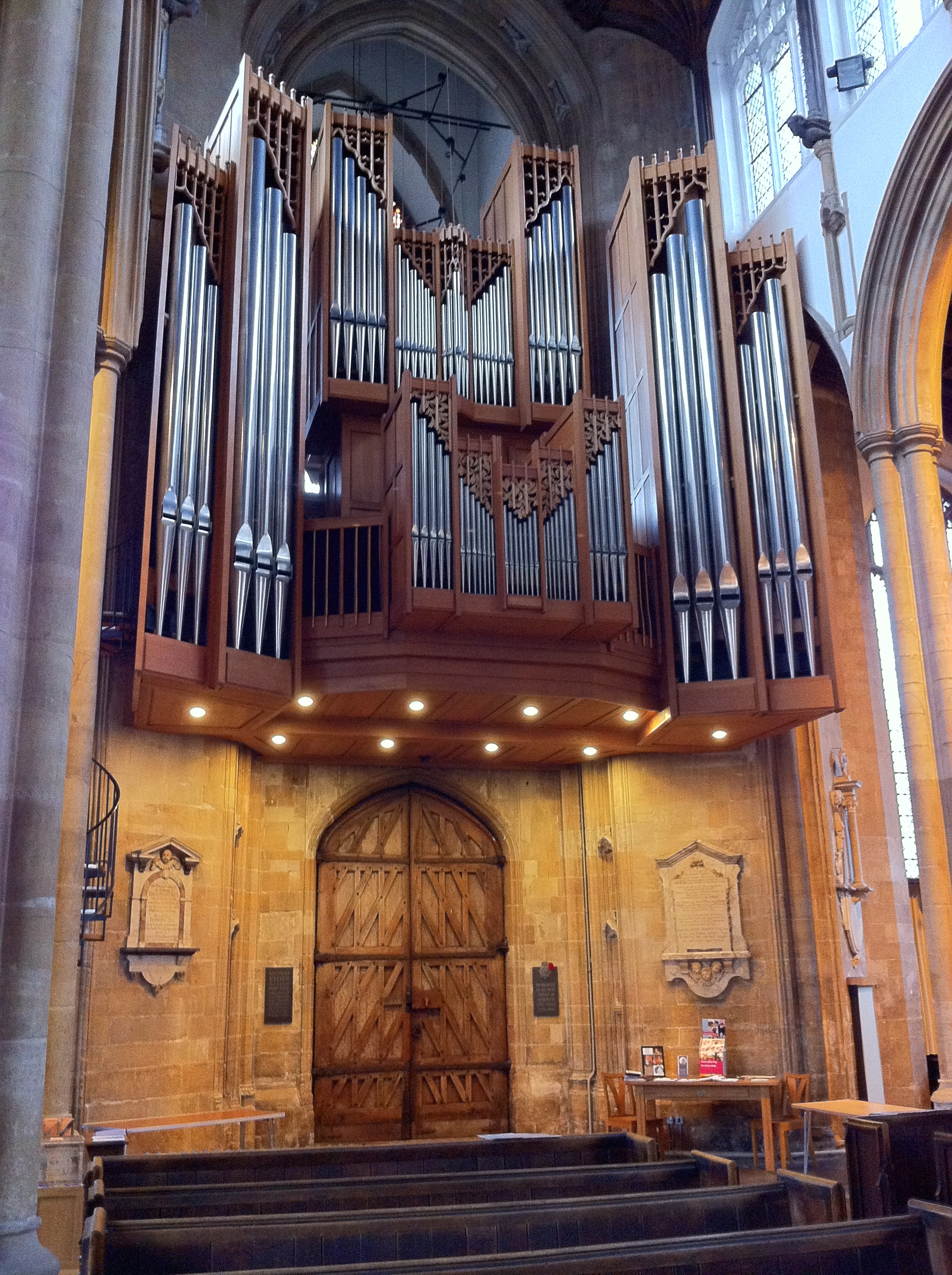
St Peter Mancroft's 1984 organ by Peter Collins is cantilevered on the gallery above its west entrance

In 1707, Renatus Harris installed an organ on a gallery which was situated at the church's west end, and this stayed here until 1866 when it was moved to the east end. In 1912, Hele & Co built an organ in the church, which was later rebuilt by Rushworth & Dreaper in 1938. A new organ by Peter Collins was installed in the west end in 1984, replacing those before it. This was designed to mimic an 18th-century baroque style, is cantilevered on the gallery, and has a completely mechanical action, which is uncommon for modern organs.

There is another, separate organ, built by W & A Boggis. From the early 18th century, this organ, whose case is made from oak, was originally positioned in front of the tower arch before being removed from the church entirely in the 19th century. It spent time in a country house until 1911 when it was brought back to the church; at this time, its original clock was replaced by a portrait of the then-vicar's daughter as a cherub, painted by Sir William Richmond, this vicar's father-in-law. It now resides at the east end of the south aisle.

=== Monuments ===
Christopher Joby has described a "monument culture" in St Peter Mancroft as there are a large number of monuments to notable individuals. Several of these monuments use multiple languages in their inscriptions. In the north aisle, there is a monument to Euphrosyne Gardner (d. February 1662), the wife of linen draper, sheriff, mayor, and Member of Parliament for Norwich Francis Gardiner. It includes an inscription which has a Greek apophthegm; "Ην γαρ φιλει Θεοσ αποθνησκει Νεος", meaning "If God loves someone, he dies young." Euphrosyne died aged 24. Above the north door is a small monument to Samuel Vout (d. 1666), which is in English despite Vout's heritage in Norwich's Dutch Stranger community.

There is a monument in Latin to the physician and author Sir Thomas Browne (1605–1682), positioned on the south side of the chancel. it mentions Sir Browne's most famous works, and indicates that his body was buried near the monument. Browne's monument was placed there by his wife, Lady Dorothy Browne (1621–1685); the couple had worshipped in the church. Dorothy Browne's own monument is located directly across the chancel and in English, describing her remains that are entombed beneath as "the prison of a bright celestiall mind, too spacious to be longer here confin'd". Sir Browne's skull was disinterred and taken to the Norfolk and Norwich Hospital in 1840, though was re-interred just below the monument in 1922, and this is marked by a stone.

There is another large monument to one of the Dutch Strangers, cloth merchant and alderman John Mackerell (d. 1722) high on the north wall. Mostly in Latin, it ends with the first two verses of Psalm 112 in Hebrew script, an unusual occurrence for the time. Robert Camell (d. 1728), assistant minister at the church who was then buried there, also has a monument that is in Latin, with one word in Greek, "θεAνθρωποΣ", meaning 'God-man'. Other monuments, to sheriff and mayor Edward Coleburne (d. 1730), sheriff of Norwich John Smith (d. 1753), the merchant Thomas Ives (d. 1781), and sheriff and mayor Thomas Starling (d. 1788), also reside in the church.

=== Ornaments ===
In 1368, St Peter Mancroft had a significant collection of items. Fabric included ten sets of vestments for a priest, deacon and subdeacon which would have included a cope, chasuble, two tunicles, and three albs, as well as 14 further vestments for single priests, five further copes, four capes for boys, nine altar frontispieces, and a large amount of altar linen, carpets and pillows. Other items included eight chalices, two cups, a pyx, dishes, cruets, candlesticks, handbells, crosses, four banners, four thuribles, an aspersorium, a chrism oil vessel, a mitre, and a pastoral staff. Service books included seven missals, six breviaries, and three psalters.

Since 1982, the north transept's St Nicholas chapel became a treasury which exhibits objects from the church's past. These include a 12th-century copy of Saint Paul's epistles which was likely illuminated by monks at Durham Priory, and a cup given to the church by Sir Peter Gleane in 1633, of 16th-century origin. One of the panels of glass that was taken from the east window to Felbrigg Hall.

The 1573 Flemish tapestry in the church

Elsewhere in the church, there is a 1573 Flemish tapestry, displaying Christ appearing to Mary as a gardener, which hangs on the wall behind the font. It may have been a frontal for an Easter altar. Sir William Richmond also painted a large depiction of Moses on Pisgah.

== Location and surroundings ==
The church was positioned such that its building aligned with the street Sadelgate, now known as White Lion Street, with an uninterrupted view from the foot of Norwich Castle bridge to the east end of the church until the 14th century. St Peter Mancroft stands on a slightly elevated position, next to Norwich Market, and as such dominates views of the market. Omanseterowe, which was a southern extension of the present St Peter's Street, ran west of the church.

St Peter Mancroft's churchyard is sloping, positioned on the west side of the Great Cockey valley. Its original extent is difficult to determine, though its western boundary has likely remained static until the present day, bounded by Omanseterowe. The eastern side of the churchyard may have extended up to a lane on the western bank of the Great Cockey; the tunnel under the chancel marks this route. Before 1368, the northern churchyard boundary was on a similar line to its location today. When the bubonic plague hit Norwich in 1349, this led to a rapid expansion of St Peter Mancroft's graveyard into the market; a 1368 charter on behalf of the urban community permitted its enlargement by as much as a 1/4 acre (1,000 m^{2}), and the northern expansion took place after this point. In the 1370s, the eastern end of the churchyard was again extended. As some of the market stalls developed into buildings, St Peter Mancroft's churchyard was encroached upon by these buildings on its eastern side.

Buildings that were formerly close by to the church's west have since been removed, though the Forum is now positioned nearby the building. A K6 telephone kiosk is situated outside the church on Weavers Lane; it has been a Grade II listed building since 1 September 1987.

== Parish ==
A parish boundary marker of St Peter Mancroft's parish on William Booth Street

The parish of St Peter Mancroft was extensive and took up much of the land in Norwich's Mancroft ward. It had bounds to the north partially along St Giles Street while including some properties on Gaol Hill, to the east by Norwich Castle motte aside from the northern end where it was bounded by the Great Cockey, to the south by the parish of St Stephen with some variation, and to the west by the line of the city wall.

In the Domesday Book of 1086, the parish had 125 householders or households, possibly 8 to 10% of the population of Norwich. If households were logged rather than householders, Ayers et al. has estimated that this was around 500 to 700 people. The parish was important for the medieval Jewish community in Norwich, with numerous Hebrew and Latin property deeds surviving here. A synagogue stood on the east side of Hay Hill.

== Reputation ==
Benjamin Mackerell, an antiquary, was the author of the first historical account of the St Peter Mancroft Parish in 1776; he wrote that the church "[r]anked among the Chiefest Parochial Churches in England." Architect Thomas Rickman in 1817 said it was "particularly [...] deserv[ing] attention." In 1962, architectural historian Nikolaus Pevsner referred to St Peter Mancroft as "The Norfolk parish church par excellence." W. G. Sebald's novel The Rings of Saturn includes mention of the church. In 2003, the church was included in the Victoria and Albert Museum's exhibition Gothic: Art for England 1400–1547.
