= Mancroft =

Medieval area of Norwich, England

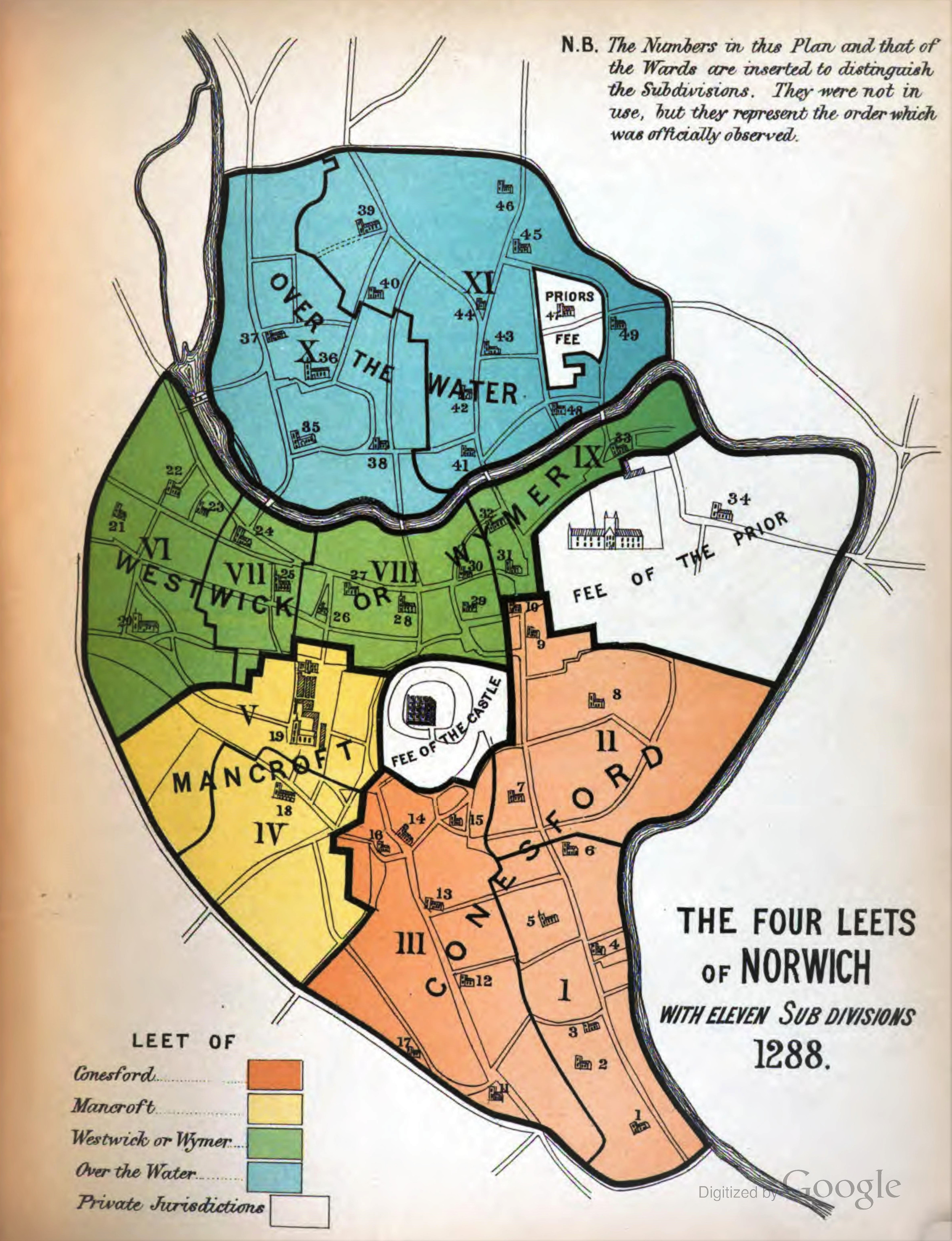
Mancroft (yellow) was built in the south-west of Norwich.

Mancroft, (Note: Mancroft likely derives from the Old English germane croft meaning 'common land', or 'common enclosure'.) initially known as the novus burgus (new borough) and the French Borough, was a medieval quarter of the city of Norwich, England, created by 1075 after the Norman Conquest of England in 1066. Built on previously undeveloped land on the western side of the city to house the Bretons who followed the earl of East Anglia Ralph de Gael to Norwich, the construction of the Borough as well as Norwich Castle and the city's cathedral drastically altered the urban landscape of the city in the Normans' favour. It is located on the western side of the city, to the south of the then-suburban area that now surrounds the present-day street of Pottergate.

== Background ==
While this part of the city is thought to have been largely rural prior to the Norman Conquest due to its S-shaped streets, archaeological excavation of the area, enabled by a fire that destroyed Norwich Central Library on 1 April 1994, has found evidence of some minor prior activity. These include parallel ditches that contained Thetford-type ware pottery as well as a pit containing Stamford ware potttery dated to the 11th century. The ditches have a distinctive alignment, suggesting a pre-Conquest date, and were possibly a tenement division, according to archaeologist Andrew Hutcheson. A Viking gold ingot and a sherd of Thetford-type ware crucible with gold residue also provide evidence for possible goldworking in the area during the Anglo-Scandinavian (860–917) or late Anglo-Saxon (917–1066) periods of the city.

Norwich as a whole consisted of three districts prior to the Norman Conquest in 1066; Conesford, Coslany and Westwick. These districts formed a united borough, all of which spoke in the Norfolk dialect of English. Motivated to come to Norwich by the city's economic vitality and strategic promise, the Normans put a new Norman aristocracy in control of the city, including the earl of East Anglia, Ralph de Gael. Following the conquest, the English of the city were not favoured as traders by the new Norman aristocracy, and so Norwich Castle was built, as was Norwich Cathedral with the relocation of the East Anglian see to Norwich, and a mass immigration of French individuals to Norwich was encouraged. These immigrants were largely Bretons, and they required accommodation.

== History ==
=== Construction ===
The French Borough was laid out from scratch, appended to the English boroughs; it was built upon a significant plot of land that was previously undeveloped, rather than the old Anglo-Scandinavian and Saxon areas of the city. Its creation reorganized the topography of Norwich significantly, cutting off the Conesford district from Coslany and Westwick. The creation of French boroughs was not a unique tactic, and was similarly enacted in other existing urban centres such as Bristol, Hereford, and Stamford, with the Anglo-Scandinavian town of Nottingham having a similar French Borough as well as a new castle. Jeffrey Jerome Cohen has put forward that "The Normans fragmented the urban topography, isolating the most important English district in order to disempower all three indigenous quarters. In so doing they quickly exerted a military, financial, ecclesiastical, and symbolic dominance over all of Norwich."

The church of St Peter Mancroft was founded in the French Borough between 1069 and 1075. It is large, unlike the larger number of smaller churches in the old Saxon part of the city. Two other large churches, St Giles and St Stephen, were also built. New tenements were laid out along Upper Market Street (now St Peters Street), at the top end of the city's then new market, as well as one tenement along what is now Bethel Street. In the Domesday Book, it is noted that the French Borough in Norwich was constructed by 1075, when there were 36 Burgesses and 6 Englishmen. That year, the failure of Earl Ralph's rebellion caused the new borough to be seized by the crown.

=== Later history ===
By 1086, the borough had increased to 125 citizens with an ethnic breakdown of this latter figure unknown. It names these French immigrants Franci de Norwic. The Borough had a new market by 1096, eventually putting the market at Tombland in the city out of business. The first instances of nonindigenous marigold and hops in England are evidenced in the medieval debris of this area, and a walnut shell has also been found which is the first known reimportation of this food since the Roman legions departed England.

Jeffrey Jerome Cohen has argued that by the early 12th century, the city "had been so completely transformed that it bore little resemblance to its former self." James Campbell has similarly argued that the Normans changed more of Norwich's urban topography in five decades than their successors were able to change in five centuries.

The defensive boundary along the western section of the Norwich Castle fee declined after its construction; Elizabeth Popescu has argued that this may have been because it was not needed due to the presence of security provided by the presence of the French Borough. By the mid-12th century, the Bethel Street brew in importance and the tenement situated on it was split into multiple properties, a layout which survived until at least the 1883 Ordnance Survey map. Two 12th-century buildings here were made of stone, indicating wealth. A lime kiln, dated between the late 12th and 14th centuries, also existed. During the High Middle Ages, the French Borough became the wealthiest area in the city; enrolled deeds of property ownership in 1285–1311 indicate that the French Borough was a primary centre of the textile industry in medieval Norwich. The French Borough became part of the densely populated medieval area of Westwick, which itself formed a part of the minor ward of West Wymer from the 15th century.

The distinction between the French and English boroughs of Norwich survived far into the Late Middle Ages, and in the 15th and 16th centuries intensive activity in the area resumed including well and pit digging. The area in particular became home to a concentration of immigrants from the Low Countries, locally known as the Strangers. The area was subject to demolition in 1961 for the creation of Norwich City Library.
