= Olivier Grossetête =

French visual artist

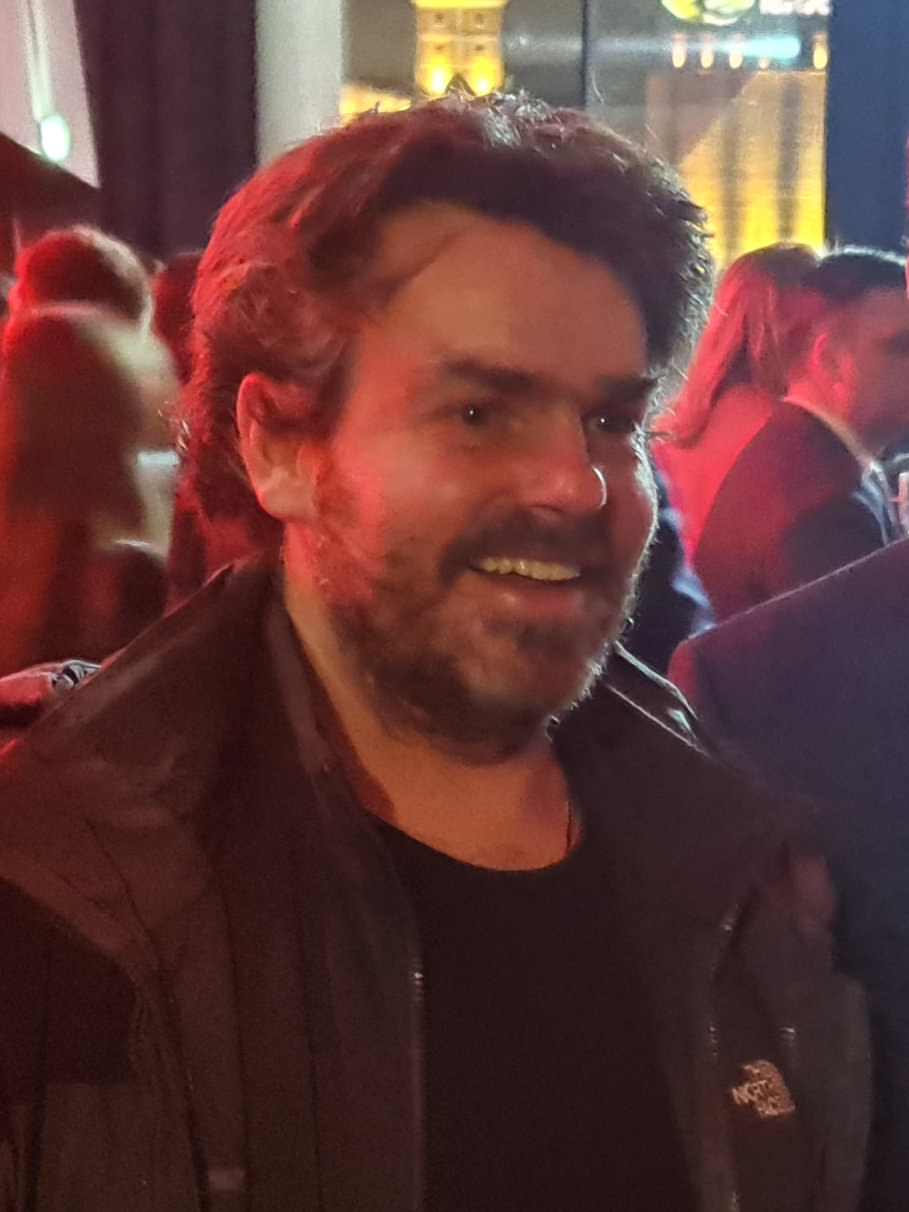
- Grossetête at the opening night of Kaunas European Capital of Culture 2022 celebrations
- Known for: Giant cardboard art installations
- Website: olivier-grossetete.com

Olivier Grossetête is a French visual artist known for his giant cardboard art installations, which he names "Participative Monumental Constructions", often based on real buildings local to the area in which the replicas are built. His works include cardboard versions of towers, cathedrals, and a series of floating cardboard bridges lifted by balloons. These structures are intentionally ephemeral and usually last only a few days before their intentional destruction.

== Career ==
Grossetête has created art using cardboard since 1998.

In 2014, as part of Norfolk and Norwich Festival, a 22-metre (72 ft) cardboard version of the church of St Peter Mancroft was designed by Grossetête and constructed by 200 volunteers on the steps of The Forum opposite the church. It used 1,000 cardboard boxes and over eight miles (13 km) of packing tape.

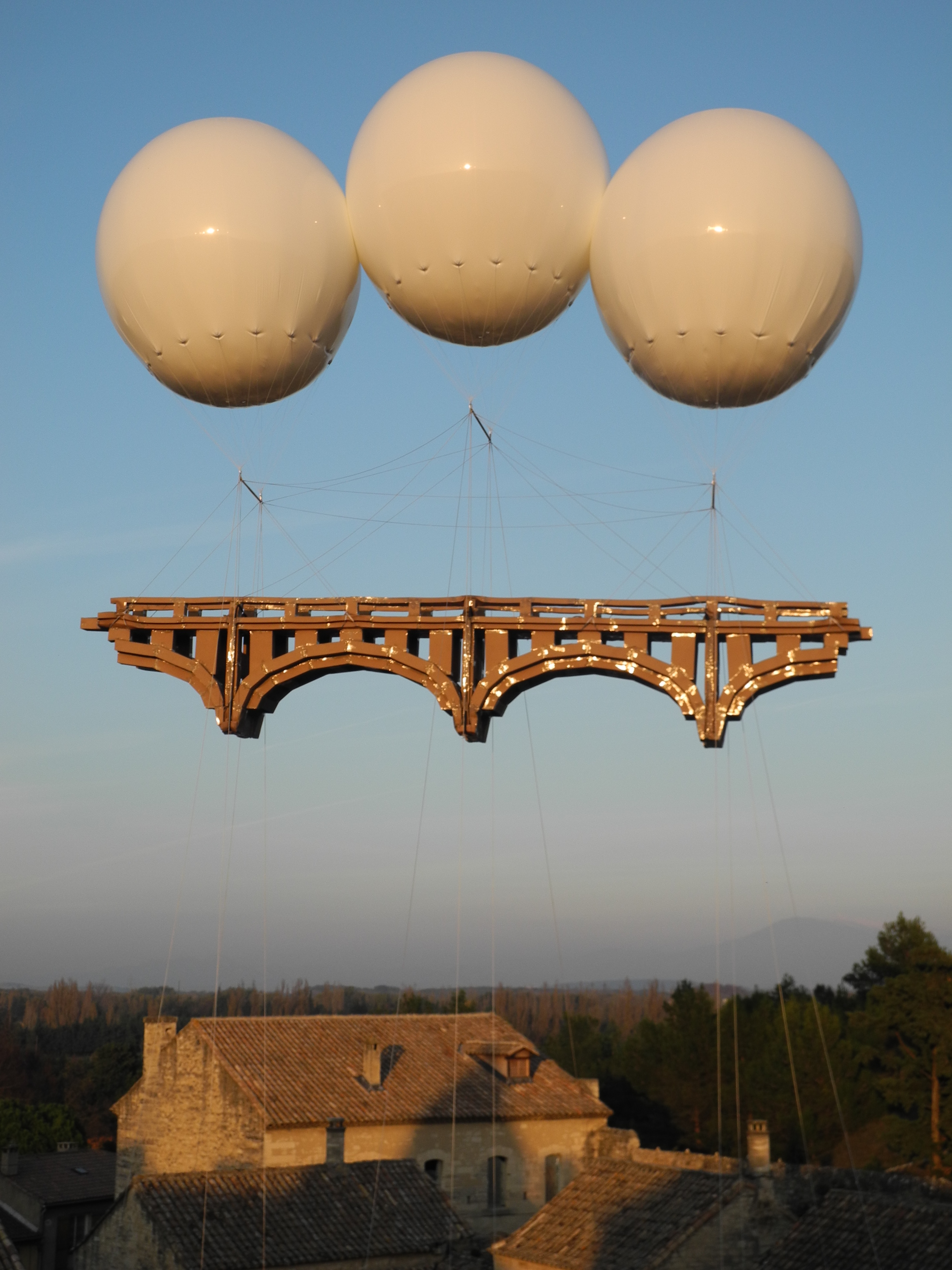
Floating bridge by Grossetête, constructed in Villeneuve-lès-Avignon, France, 2015

In January 2016 at the Cutaway in Barangaroo, Sydney, Australia, Grossetête staged the Ephemeral City, which featured multiple cardboard towers. It was taken down on the final day of the Sydney Festival and festivalgoers were allowed to stomp the work into the ground. Grossetête's cardboard version of Donnington Castle in Newbury, Berkshire, UK, which was constructed with help from the public on 29 May, was knocked over by wind before its planned demolishing on the 30th.

In 2017 for Galway International Arts Festival in Ireland, Grossetête led the construction of a cardboard replica of the Aula Maxima in Eyre Square. In Pukekura Park in New Plymouth, New Zealand in September 2017, Grossetête designed a People's Tower for the Taranaki Arts Festival, and was assisted in its construction by volunteers as well as head builders Christophe Goddet and Lionel Puddu. It was the first of its kind in New Zealand. The tower reached 10 metres (33 ft) despite a significant amount of rain, and stood for less than a day. For Christchurch Arts Festival, also in New Zealand, Grossetête's cardboard version of the local Christ Church Cathedral was erected on 9 September 2017, the same day the Synod made the decision to restore the real cathedral following damage from the 2010 Christchurch earthquake. This work was made by volunteers from about 1300 cardboard boxes and was 16 metres (52 ft) tall. Plans to pull the structure down at 3pm on 10 September went awry when a sudden hailstorm caused it to fall at 1pm instead, in a corkscrew fashion.

On 20 and 21 July 2018, he returned to Galway International Arts Festival for his event The People Build, in which he recruited hundreds of volunteers to build two structures; a cardboard bridge at Waterside in tribute to Galway's River Corrib viaduct, and a cardboard version of St Nicholas' Collegiate Church on Eyre Square. When positioning the bridge using boats, it broke free of the buoy holding it and was recovered after a short boat chase. Both structures were demolished on 22 July. In August 2019, Grossetête and volunteers erected his largest work thus far in Le Havre, France, based on the city itself.

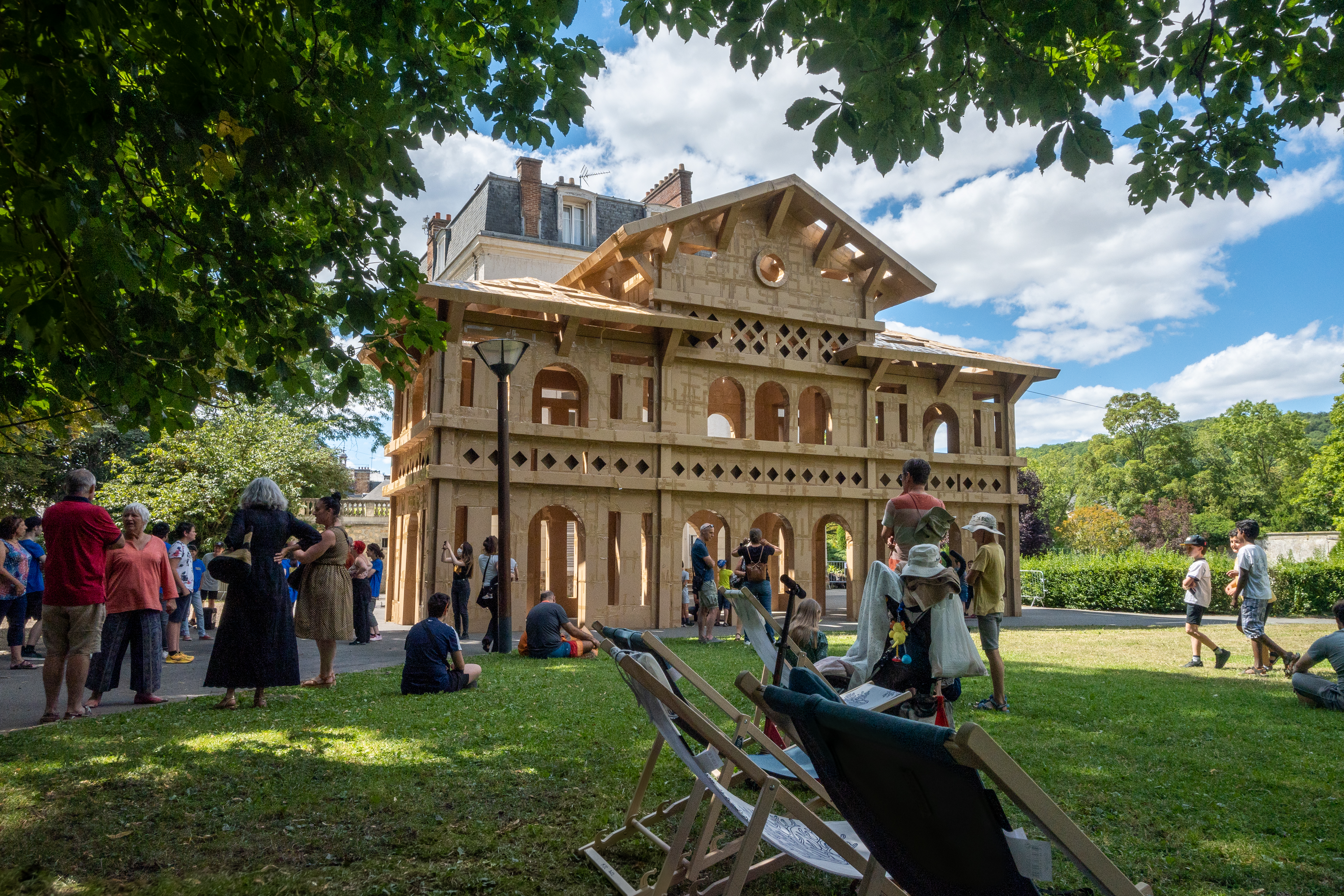
A cardboard version of Gare d'Orsay by Grossetête, July 2022

By 2022, Grossetête continued in creating a series of floading cardboard bridges, having already done so in Japan, France and Italy. These works were usually held up with balloons, and were designed and created in around a week with the aid of 15 to 30 workshop participants. These installations sometimes weighed more than 1.5 tons.

On 11 August 2023 as part of the inaugural Novum Summer Festival, Grossetête enlisted hundreds of volunteers to erect a 45-foot (14 m) tall cardboard building outside Newcastle Civic Centre in the UK. In October, a cardboard replica of Wolsey's Gate designed by Grossetête was constructed in collaboration with Spill Festival on the Cornhill in Ipswich, UK. It remained standing for two days.

On 15 June 2024, Grossetête enlisted over 100 volunteers to create the facade of the ancient theater of Mandeure, in the Doubs, out of cardboard.

== Artistry ==
He also refers to his giant cardboard installations as "Participative Monumental Constructions". He has also frequently nicknamed his creations "The People's Tower". They are usually based on real buildings, and always designed specific to the place where they are being constructed.

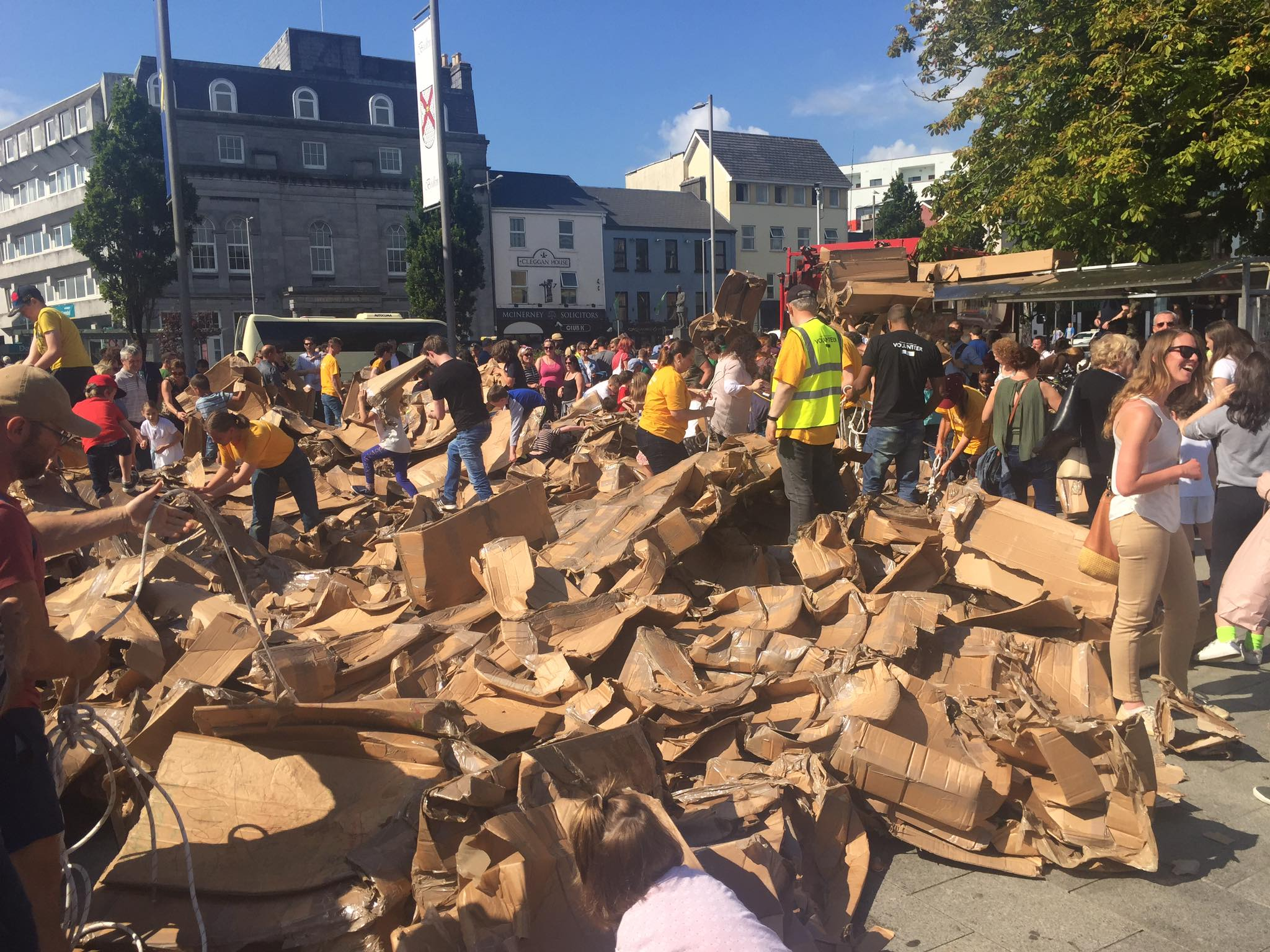
The result of a demolition of Grossetête's The People Build in Galway, Ireland, 2018

His installations are largely ephemeral, and he has referred to them as "utopian building(s), temporary and useless". He has said that due to their ephemerality, "Their stake is, therefore, as much in the process, in the journey, and in the collective experience they propose, as in their final forms."

He has remarked that, "Despite its appearance, [cardboard] has quite extraordinary capacities and is very light. It doesn’t scare anyone, and it allows me to open my practice to the greatest number of people". He has also noted that "It's easy to work with, and it's easy to teach people what to do." He has also praised its capability to transcend class barriers as "You can be poor and still have cardboard, it makes absolutely no difference". He has described cardboard as "the symbol of the false and of the appearance," and links it with architecture; "cardboard is about packaging — it's all about façades, which is closely linked to architecture."

== Personal life ==
As of 2021, Grossetête was living in Jausiers in the Alpes de Hautes Provences.
