= William Ellis (14th-century MP) =

Member of the Parliament of England

William Ellis, of Burton in Kennington and Canterbury, Kent was an English politician.

== Family ==
Ellis married, before 1381, a woman named Isabel; they had a son, Thomas Ellis, MP for Kent constituency.

== Career ==
Ellis was a Member of Parliament for Canterbury constituency in May 1382, February 1383, November 1384, February 1388 and 1395.
