= Benjamin Mackerell =

English antiquarian

- Died: Marcy 1738
- Occupation: Antiquarian

Benjamin Mackerell (died March 1738) was an English antiquarian from Norfolk.

== Biography ==
Mackerell was second son of John Mackerell alderman, of Norwich (Norfolk Archæology, ii. 382), by Anne, daughter of Elias Browne of the same city (Addit. MS. 23011, f. 28). From 1716 to 1732, he was librarian of the Norwich public library, and in the latter year printed a 'New Catalogue of the Books,' 4to, Norwich, together with am 'Account of Mr. John Kirkpatrick's Roman and other Coins.' He died in March 1738 (London Mag. vii. 104), and was buried on April following in the chancel of St. Stephen's Church, Norwich (parish register). He married in 1723, and had several children.

Mackerell was an accurate, painstaking antiquary, and left work of permanent value. Just before or after his death appeared his 'History and Antiquities of ... King's-Lynn,' 8vo, London, 1738, which is chiefly an abridgment of John Green's manuscript collections (Richards, Hist. of Lynn, pp. i, iv). The manuscript was later in the possession of Mr. E. M. Beloe of Lynn. He also left ready for printing a history of Norwich in two quarto volumes, which was afterwards acquired by Hudson Gurney of Keswick Hall, Norfolk. Two copies of his manuscript 'Brief Historical Account of the Church of Saint Peter of Mancroft, in the City of Norwich ... with Draughts of all the Monuments,' &c, compiled in 1735–6, which he intended to be deposited in that church, are in the British Museum, Additional MSS. 9370 and 23011, where are also two duodecimo volumes of notes on Norfolk and Norwich churches, with inscriptions collected by him, Additional MSS. 12525–6. He copied likewise the inscriptions and coats of arms in St. Stephen's Church, Norwich (1729–37), with exact measurements of each stone and brass, adding some observations on the parish. This carefully executed manuscript is preserved, according to his wish, in the vestry of the church.
