= Peter Collins (organ builder) =

English organ builder (1941–2015)

- Peter Collins
- Born: April 1941
- Died: 24 October 2015 (aged 74)
- Occupation: Pipe organ builder
- Years active: 1964-2015

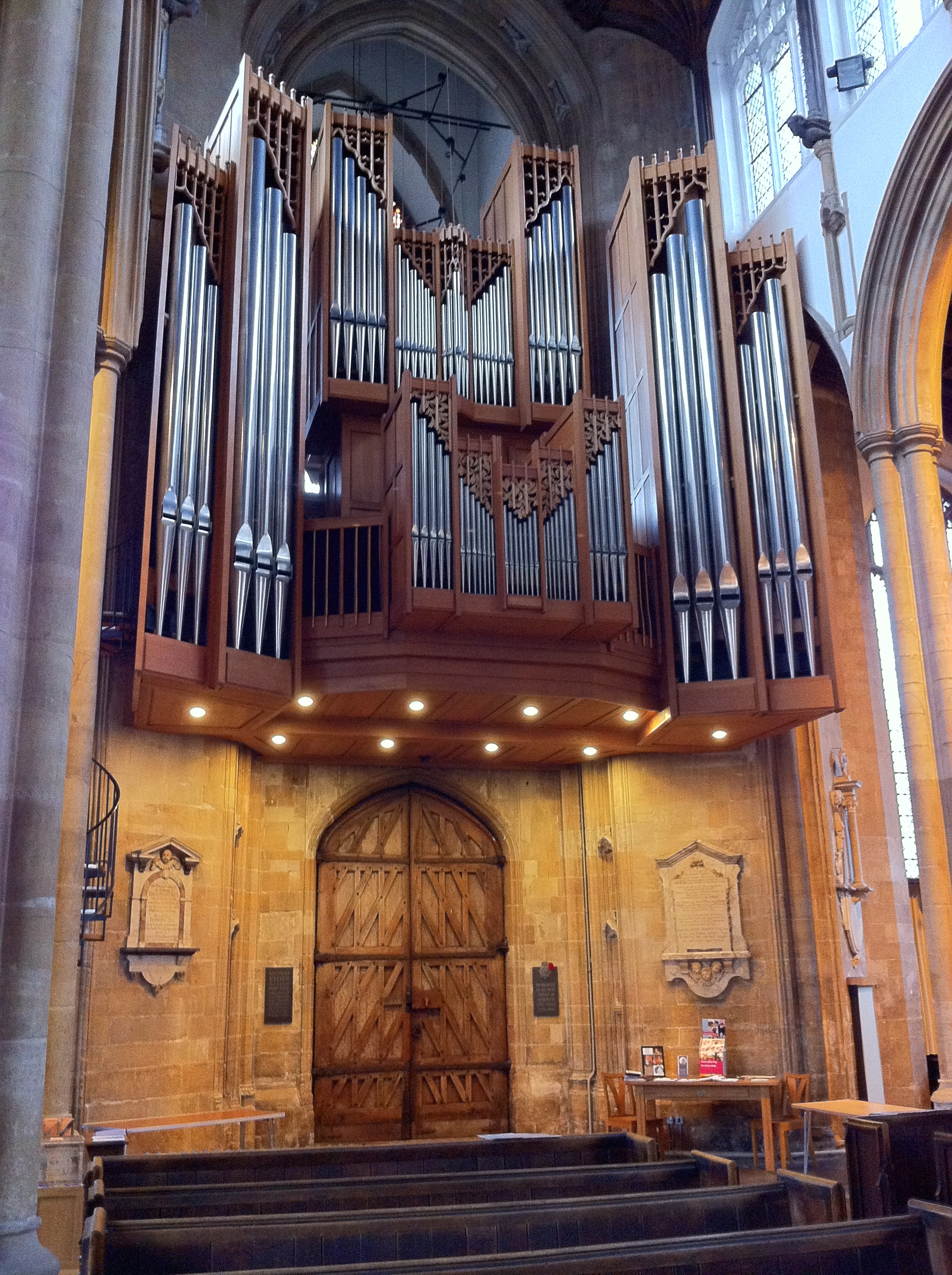
Organ in St Peter Mancroft of 1984

Peter Collins (1941 – 24 October 2015) was an English pipe organ builder based in Melton Mowbray, Leicestershire. He specialised in tracker action organs. Collins was an advocate of computer-aided design, using it to produce compact instruments and to control material costs.

Collins served his apprenticeship with Bishops of London, but became disillusioned with the conservatism of English organ building, so left for further training with Rieger, in Austria. On his return in 1964 he started a small company near St. Albans. His first notable instrument was a classically-voiced, free-standing tracker instrument for St. Faith's church, Shellingford, Oxfordshire. Over time he moved first to Redbourn, then to the company's long-term home in Melton Mowbray, Leicestershire.

Early orders were mostly for box organs and house instruments, and the continuo business brought him into contact with the world of historically informed performance, and exhibition at St. Albans International Organ Festival kept him in touch with the Northern European organ scene, and players from around the world. More significant commissions included a number of instruments for universities, schools and conservatories, including one for the Turner-Sims concert hall at the University of Southampton (now moved to St. Barnabas, Orford). Through this commission he met Ralph Downes, who commissioned probably Collins' most famous instrument, at St. David's Hall, Cardiff. The instrument shows Downes' influence in its scale and tonality, being capable of filling the space with ease.

He became known for striking, modern casework, and for well-balanced mechanical action, though he also collaborated with digital organ builder Allen on a number of hybrid pipe / digital instruments, each of which permits the pipe organ to be played as a musically integral instrument, with additional digital voicing for more expansive performance - a controversial move which led to his firm's expulsion from the Institute of British Organ Building - but his company also carried out sensitive restorations and rebuilds of a large number of one and two manual church organs, often from the 19th Century.

Collins had a long association with the St. Albans festival, for which he built two organs, one located at St. Saviour's Church, St. Albans, as noted below, the other, designed for concerto repertoire, almost complete on his death. He was taken ill while installing his instrument, and died before its completion.

The company entered a creditors voluntary liquidation on 20 January 2017, leaving a number of unfinished projects including the relocation of the Turner Sims organ to Orford, which was completed in 2019. Cousans organs of Coalville, also in Leicestershire, completed this and another incomplete project.

== Organs in the UK ==
Examples are to be found in the UK including Greyfriars Kirk, Edinburgh; St Peter Mancroft, Norwich; Orford parish church (formerly at the Turner Sims Concert Hall, Southampton)), and Fitzwilliam College Chapel, Cambridge. His largest organ was built for St David's Hall, Cardiff (subsequently rebuilt in part by Walker).

A notable commission was for the St Albans International Organ Festival (IOF), with which Collins was associated for some time; the IOF organ (sited in St Saviour's church) was built in 1989 in the style of Andreas Silbermann (1678–1734). Peter Hurford, who founded the IOF while he was organist of St Albans Cathedral, played commissioning recitals on a number of Collins organs, and also recorded on some of them.

== Organs in other countries ==
Peter Collins's organs are found in a number of other countries, including Australia, France, Germany (Magdalenenkirche Bayreuth); Norway, Korea, Sweden (a controversial collaboration with digital organ builders Allen in Trönö), and the United States.
