= Thomas Ellis (15th-century MP) =

English politician

Thomas Ellis of Kennington, Kent was an English politician.

== Family ==
Ellis was the son of William Ellis and Isabel his wife. He married Katherine Barry, daughter and heiress of John Barry of Sevington, Kent. They are thought to have had two sons and three daughters.

== Career ==
Ellis was elected as a Member of Parliament for Kent in December 1421 and appointed High Sheriff of Kent for 1427–28.
