= Christopher Garneys =

Sir Christopher Garneys or Garnysse (died 1534), was the chief porter of Calais, and a gentleman usher of the king's chamber in the beginning of the reign of Henry VIII.

He was the king's companion in the masquerades then popular at court, and won money at cards from his royal master. He was rewarded by an annuity of 10l., soon afterwards increased to 20l. and 30l., by grants of lands in several counties, viz. the manors of Bargham, Wiggenholt, and Greatham in Sussex, Saxlingham in Norfolk, and Wellington in Shropshire, and by the wardship of the son and heir of Henry Kebill, a London Alderman. He was bailiff of the lordship of Stockton Socon, Suffolk, and keeper of the New Park, near Nottingham Castle. In 1513 he took part in the campaign in France, when the king, on the day (25 September) of his victorious entry into Tournai, knighted him in the cathedral after mass. At some point in the next year he quarreled with the court poet John Skelton, and exchanged a series of polemical poems with him (though only Skelton's contributions survive). He afterwards resided at Greenwich, probably near the palace, and served on the commission of the peace in Kent from 1514 to 1521.

In 1514 he was sent with the embassy to Louis XII just before his marriage with the Princess Mary of England. In the following year he went north with a present of dress from Henry VIII to his other sister the queen of Scotland. In 1520 he was at Calais preparing lodgings for the court at the Field of the Cloth of Gold. In 1522 his signature is regularly appended to the letters from the deputy and council of Calais, though his office, if he held one, must have been insignificant. In 1526 he was appointed chief porter of Calais, a post of which he had already held the reversion for some ten years, and the remainder of his life was spent in the discharge of his duties as porter, and as commissioner of sewers for the marshes of Calais, which included supervision of the sea-banks. One of his duties, not mentioned in his patent, was to keep the king supplied with artichokes, fresh vegetables and fruit being a scarce luxury in England at that time. He died in October 1534, and was succeeded by Sir Thomas Palmer of Newnhambridge, who describes his predecessor as 'an honest man, and no beggar as I am. Sir, thanks be to the king's highness, he had cause, for the king gave him a widow with four hundred marks land, and l,000l. In her purse, and she had five hundred marks in plate; and also the ward of a merchant's son of London, where he had for the said ward 800l. sterling paid on a day, and besides, the kind's highness gave him 30l. land to him and his heirs.'

For coat armour he bore argent, a chevron azure between three escallops sable, and for crest, a cubit arm grasping a scimitar embossed, all proper, hilt and pommel or. There are several specimens of his handwriting among the State Papers of the period. His widow, whose name was Joan, survived him some time, but it does not appear that he left any heirs.
