= Anthonie de Solempne =

16th-century Dutch printer who lived in Norwich, England

- Citizenship: England
- Occupation: Printing press operator
- Years active: 1567–1572
- Known for: First operator of a printing press in Norwich

Anthonie de Solempne was a 16th-century Dutch refugee (also known as an Elizabethan Strangers) to the city of Norwich, England who was the first operator of a printing press in the city from around 1567 until at least 1572. Originally a spice merchant in Antwerp, his connection with typographer Albert Christiaensz allowed him to set up a printing press in the city with his own financial backing. He was employed by the Norwich Corporation in 1570 to print bye-laws and obtained citizenship the same year. One of the most wealthy members of the refugee community in the city, he later moved to the White Dove in the city in 1572, possibly switching occupations to sell liquor.

== Life in Antwerp ==
In Antwerp in the province of Brabant, Solempne worked as a spice merchant or broker. A 15 March 1566 entry in the Antwerps Poortersboek lists him as a son of one Steven from Mechelen. By June 1567 he was engaged in the process of ending his business affairs, likely in anticipation of the arrival of the Duke of Alva and his army of Spanish veterans who would have caused him severe retribution for being a Calvinist. A 9 June notarial act states that Solempne had informed magistrates under oath that he needed to go to Culemborg and then to Cleves and Gelderland to collect debts, though he likely instead left for England. There is no evidence that Solempne had a connection to the printing or book trades prior to his arrival in Norwich.

== As a printer in Norwich ==
Solempne arrived in Norwich in the late summer or autumn of 1567, accompanied by his wife and two sons. He was a member of the large community of Dutch and Walloon refugees who migrated into Norwich. Being that there were no printers in Norwich's native population, it is likely that he gained a connection to the printing trade through an acquaintanceship with other refugees. He began operating a printing press near the commercial centre of the city in the parish of St Andrew soon after his arrival. He became the first practitioner of this trade in the city, and his was likely the only press operated by exiles in an English provincial town prior to the start of the Dutch Revolt.

Solempne appears in a summer 1568 census of this community by agents of John Parkhurst, the bishop of Norwich. On this list, Solempne was one of several individuals involved in the book trade, including bookseller and printer Jan Paets [Joannes Paetz Jacobszoon], and booksellers and binders Anthonius Rabat, Cornelius Van Hille, and Petrus Jass (or Jason). Solempne was, however, listed as one of only two printers, the other being listed as typographer Albertus Christiani, who was likely in fact Albert Christiaensz, a member of a group of Protestant rebel printers that had worked in Dutch town of Vianen under the protection of Hendrik van Brederode. There is no direct evidence that Solempne and Christiaensz worked together, with his name not appearing in any imprints from Solempne's press. Furthermore, there is no further reference to Christiaensz in the surviving Norwich records about the Dutch community; he may have left soon after. Christiaensz's presence may explain Solempne's sudden acquisition of typographical materials and a skilled workforce through either advising Solempne or giving him his own tools. Christopher Joby has argued that Solempne likely worked as a publisher, managing the business's finances and external relationships with authors and customers, while Christiaensz most likely worked as the compositor for Solempne's press, and Rebecca Feakes has postulated that while Christiaenz set the type, Solempne was the business's non-apprenticed 'typographer' and was more of a financial backer and entrepreneur.

His business became unusually well-equipped and competently manned for its time and location, as evidenced from two surviving books from his press dated to 1568. These two impressive works, Belijdenisse and Psalmen Davids, began an industrious period for his workshop that would last until 1571. It sought to meet demand for Dutch liturgical and doctrinal literature in Norwich, as by 1568 there were over 1,000 members of the Flemish Stranger community in the city. None of the works from Solempne's press were recorded in the Stationers' Register; this is not unique, but suggests that he had tacit approval of the town's corporation and the Duke of Norfolk in terms of his printing.

His productions after 1568 were smaller, less ambitious, had lower standards of workmanship, used a smaller variety of types, and were no longer solely aimed at the refugee community or specifically related to the Dutch Reformed Church. The publication of Tableau de l'oeuure de Dieu by the press in 1569, which horrified the minister of the Norwich Walloon church, may have brought the attention of the bishop of London to Solempne's press, possibly causing a tightening of control over its operations, though there is no record of action being taken against Solempne, though broadsides after this point carry the legend "seen and allowed"

From May 1570, Solempne was being employed by the Norwich Corporation to print bye-laws, and at about the same time he was also paid to print "pclamacons" by the overseers of the poor for the parish of St Andrew. The Corporation allowed Solempne to purchase his full rights of citizenship; on 11 December 1570, Solempne was entered into the book of freemen after buying his freedom for forty shillings to work as a printer and sell Rhenish wine. Here, he was described as a militiaman and church elder. Though printing was usually highly restricted outside London, Solempne was seemingly allowed to operate his press in Norwich with little regard to these restrictions. He became a well-respected member of the Dutch congregation in Norwich. Later subsidy records show that he was one of the most wealthy members of the refugee community in the city.

=== Possible occupation change ===
Exactly how long he practised is uncertain. However, the final item which can be attributed to Solempne's press with certainty dates from 1571 to 1572; this took place at the same time as a change of Solempne's accommodation; he moved to premises at the sign of the White Dove in St John Maddermarket's parish in 1572. This possibly coincided with a change of his occupation, with this premises being known to sell liquor. In 1581, he was an alien and was paying lay subsidy in the same parish, with his assets valued at £8 which was the highest amongst the Strangers in the parish as well as amongst Strangers in Norwich as a whole. He stayed at this address until at least 1584, though possibly later.

== Works ==
Possibly up to thirteen works were produced by Solempne's press, consisting of liturgical and pedagogical books as well as more controversial works like anti-Catholic or anti-Spanish pamphlets. There are several items from Solempne's printing press which have survived, though many other surviving items are incorrectly attributed to him. Four of Solempne's productions after 1568 survive, three being broadsheets and the fourth consisting of one octavo book.

=== Books for Dutch Reformed Church services ===
Three works were printed by Solempne's press for use in Dutch Reformed Church services and for the teaching of Reformed Christian doctrine, in octavo. There is no firm evidence that these works were smuggled into the Low Countries, though this is possible. They may have also made their way to the Dutch-speaking exile community in King's Lynn, Norfolk.

Two of these, printed in 1568 and in Dutch, are bound together. The first is an edition of the psalms as well as some prayers in metre, translated by Petrus Dathenus and bound with the second work, a catechism. The original work was first published just two years earlier, in Heidelberg, and the Dutch church in London did not adopt the Dathenus psalter until 1571. Solempne's print was possibly copied from an anonymously printed 1567 edition of these titles with the same preface by Dathenus, with added annotations, an introduction to the fundamentals of psalm music, and a different text layout. This Solempne-printed book used five relatively common black letter types, including a brevier roman, a pica italic, individual sorts from an uncial type, and Granjon's second music type-face as well as an ornate woodcut initial letter 'U'. Two versions of this bound work survive.

The third work of this type, also surviving from 1568, consists of Dutch versions of two confessions of faith which are the Second Helvetic Confession by Heinrich Bullinger, used in the Swiss Reformed churches, and the Gallican Confession which was typically used in France. Both of these were printed in Dutch for the first time in Norwich, suggesting that they were also possibly translated there. This work uses the same set of letter types as the other octavo works. Three skeleton formes are used in these books. Its paper has watermarks from Leiden, meaning this paper was imported from the Low Countries. A copy of the work is in the Norwich Millennium Library.

=== Anti-Catholic and anti-Spanish works ===
In contrast to towns in mainland Europe, Norwich was a relatively safe place to print controversial work that opposed Catholicism, enabling Solempne's press more freedom in printing these works.

Historie van B[roer] Cornelis Adriaensen van Dordrecht (History of Brother Cornelis Adriaensen of Dordrecht), with 552 numbered pages in octavo, is an anti-clerical satire on Adriaensen's misdeeds as a friar minor and a Catholic preacher, originally by Hubert Goltzius. It is debated as to whether this may be the first edition of this work, with ther candidates existing in Brugge and Ghent. This edition is dated "Ghedruct uit Jaer 1569", though otherwise does not state its place of publication or printer. Historians were initially hesitant to label this work as a production of Solempne's press, though later analysis of typefaces has confirmed that it came from his workshop.

Other works do not bear Solempne's name, though based on analysis of their types were likely printed using his press in Norwich. One such example is the two-part Requiem aeternam, dat is, het Nederlantsche claechliedt, ghemaeckt op dese teghenwoordighe tyden inde Nederlanden, die nu suchten onder dat jock der Spaenscher moordadigher tyrannie, (Requiem aeternam, that is the Netherlandish lamentation made in these present times in the Netherlands, which now groan under that yoke of the murderous Spanish tyranny). This was printed in 1568 in duodecimo, and is a collection of songs and other texts aimed at Dutch speakers in the Low Countries who felt oppressed by the Spanish. They falsely claim to have been printed 'outside Cologne'.

Two anonymous pamphlets from 1570, both in octavo and without imprings, attack the Duke of Alva and the Spanish Inquisition and were similarly likely printed by the Solempne press. These are Alva, Fernando Alvarez, Bewijsinge dat de commissie die ducq Dalve heeft laten uutgaen, by den paus met zijn tyrannighe adherenten op den naem vanden coninck, onwetelijcken versiert, gedicht ende hem verleden is, and Bewijsinghe dat in alle de Nederlanden gheen papist of catholijck persoon en is, na het seggen der Spaenscher inquisiteuren ende het concilie van Trenten. Another tract is Den val der roomscher kercken, met alle haer afgoderiie (The Fall of the Roman church with all her idolatry), also in octavo and from 1570, which is a reprint of Steven Mierdman's translation of The faull of the romyshe churche from 1547.

=== Tableau de l'oeuure de Dieu ===
In July 1569, Solempne was commissioned by a wealthy merchant to print 100 copies of a small broadsheet in French; this was titled Tableau de l'oeuure de Dieu (Table of the work of God). It was a work of Spanish Protestant minister and 1567 refugee from Antwerp to London Antonio del Corro, translated from Latin with its original title being De opera Dei (On the work of God). This was the first French version of this work. There is a sole surviving copy, which contains four of Solempne's blackletter typefaces and two of ornaments from his edition of the psalms.

Corro later stated that Solempne's ability to quote a lower price of one crown motivated him to come to Norwich to have it printed, though it was also more difficult to legally print works such as this in London. Reading the printing, Corro found that Solempne was not conversant with French and so asked the minister of the Norwich Walloon church, De la Forest, to correct the broadsheet's French. However, the minister reviled the work and covered the margins of the broadsheet with 25 "censures", stating that the broadsheet was an attack on orthodox christology and predestination. The work was still produced, but with no name of printer or place of publication, and later caused a large controversy between Corro and the elders of his adopted Italian Protestant congregation in London. Edmund Grindal, Bishop of London, noted that the publication had not been submitted for approval, and Corro was later suspended from preaching.

=== Other works ===
Certayne Versis writtene by Thomas Brooks, an execution broadside in English, dates to 1570 and contains lines purporting to have been written by a leader of a minor conspiracy who was hanged in Norwich in August that year, featuring a unique woodcut initial 'I'. The broadside conformed with the Injunction of 1559 and had been licensed by the local ecclesiastical authorities.

Another production from Solempne's press in 1570 was Eenen Calendier, a perpetual calendar and almanac in Dutch, which also contained material aimed toward the Norwich refugee community. This work is in octavo and contains all of Solempne's black letter and roman types together with an uncial not found in other works.

A broadsheet exists in English with a handwritten version of Solempne's imprint dating from 1572, titled A Prayer to be Sayd in the End of the Mornyng Prayer Daily (through the Dioeces of Norwich) during the Tyme of this Sharp Wether, of Frost and Snow. It was printed using three of Solempne's black letter typefaces in the parish of St Andrew, being allowed by the licensing authority.

== Typefaces ==
Solempne's largest textura was Vostre’s 2-line Great Primer Textura, with his French Great Primer Textura being another. His Lettersnijder's Pica Textura features as a main text type in his work and went through several variations, gaining damage over time. Others include his Parisian Textura on Bourgeois, and his smallest, Parisian Textura on Brevier. Additional typefaces, which Solempne used to signal changes in textual units as well as section breaks on pages, included a 54mm Brevier roman and an 80mm Pica italic. Many of these typefaces can be identified as Solempne's based on the damage to various letters in the set.

== Historiography ==
Mention of Solempne's press is often absent in academia on printing culture in early modern Europe, with some exceptions.
