= Cornelis Brouwer (disambiguation) =

Cornelis Brouwer (c. 1615–1681) was a Dutch Golden Age painter.

Cornelis Brouwer may also refer to:

- Cornelis Adriaensen (also called Cornelis Brouwer; 1521–1581), Flemish Franciscan preacher and writer
- Cornelis Brouwer (athlete) (1900–1952), Dutch long-distance runner
