= Norwich Castle =

Norman castle in Norwich, England

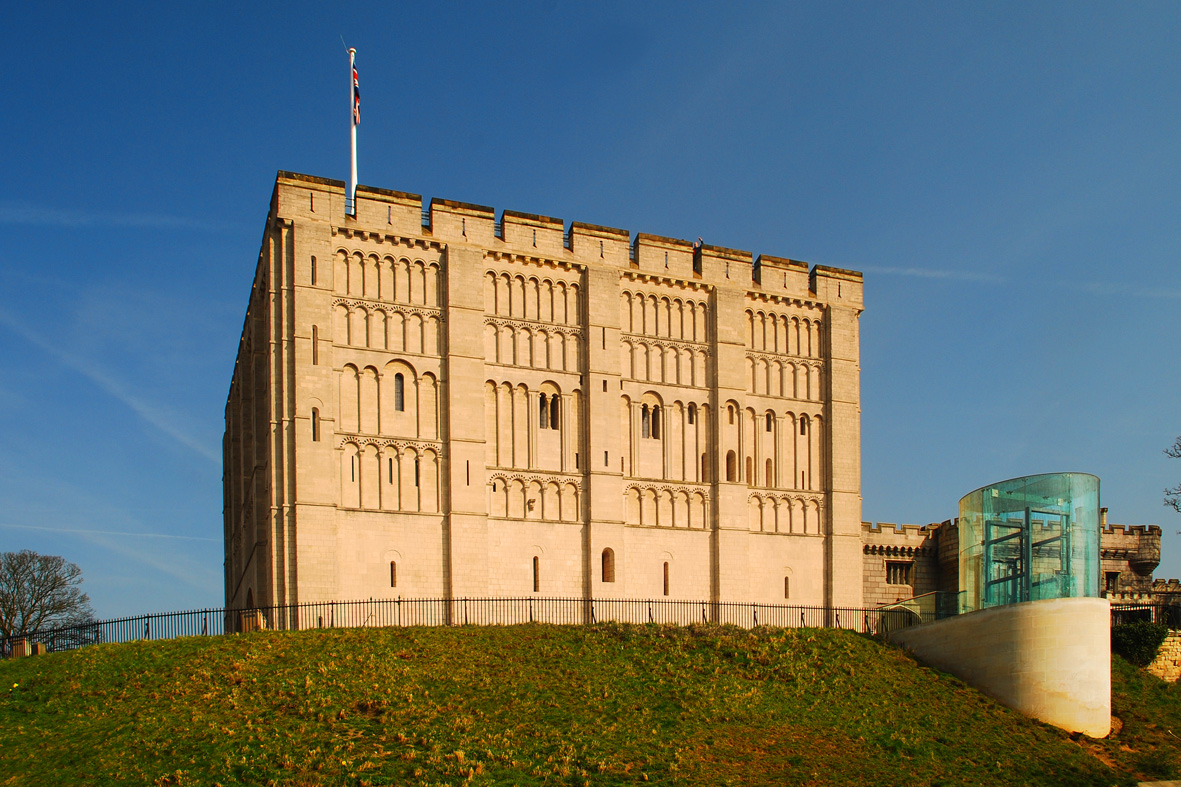
- Norwich Castle, March 2009

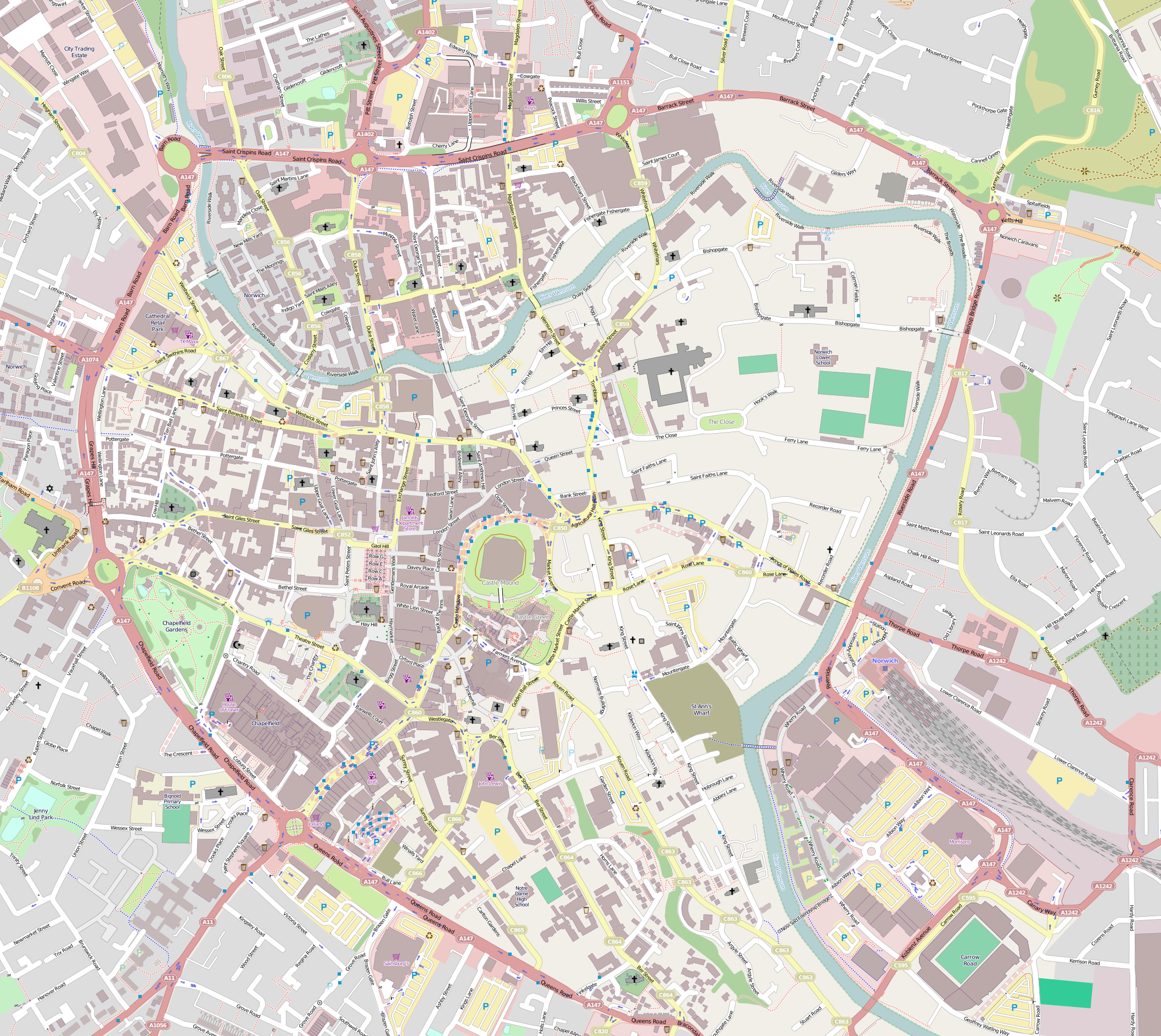
- Location within Norwich Location within Norfolk
- 52.6286°N 1.2964°E
- Type: Motte-and-bailey castle
- Location: Norwich

History
- Built: 1067 onwards

Site notes
- Height: 27 metres (89 ft)
- Architectural style: Norman
- Governing body: Norfolk Museums and Archaeology Service

Listed Building – Grade I
- Designated: 26 February 1954
- Reference no.: 1372724

Norwich Castle is a medieval royal fortification in the city of Norwich, in the English county of Norfolk. William the Conqueror (1066–1087) ordered its construction in the aftermath of the Norman Conquest of England. The castle was used as a gaol from 1220 to 1887. In 1894, the Norwich Museum moved to Norwich Castle. The museum and art gallery holds significant objects from the region, especially works of art, archaeological finds and natural history specimens.

The historic national importance of the Norwich Castle site was recognised in 1915 with its listing as a scheduled monument. The castle buildings, including the keep, attached gothic style gatehouse and former prison wings, were given Grade I listed building status in 1954. (Note: Listed building legislation was enacted in 1947) The castle is one of the city's twelve heritage sites, and is managed by the Norfolk Museums Service.

The interior of the keep was reconstructed over five years to how it would have looked in the early 12th century, fully reopening in August 2025.

== History ==
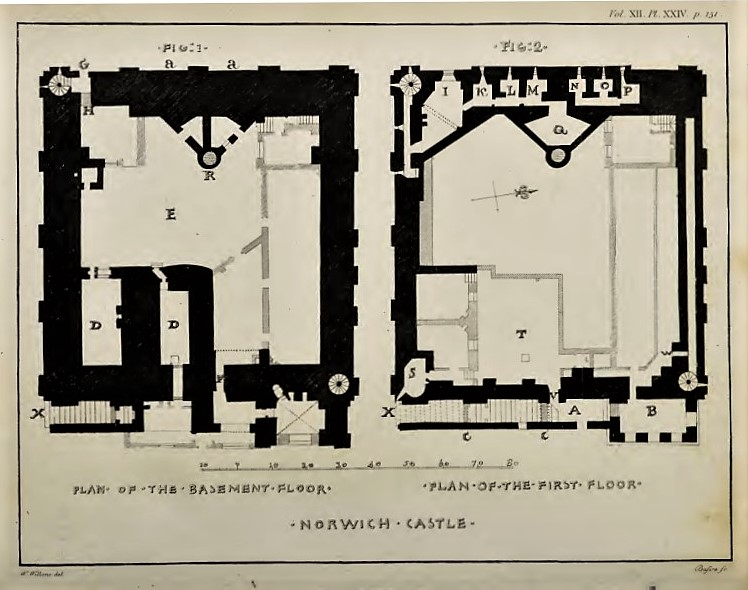
Plan of Norwich Castle keep by William Wilkins, prior to alterations completed in 1793 by John Soane

Norwich Castle was founded by William the Conqueror some time between 1066 and 1075 and originally took the form of a motte and bailey. Early in 1067, William embarked on a campaign to subjugate East Anglia, and according to military historian R. Allen Brown it was probably around this time that the castle was founded. The earliest recorded incident at the castle is in 1075, when it was besieged by troops loyal to William to put down a rebellion known as the Revolt of the Earls, co-led by Ralph de Gael, Earl of Norfolk. Ralph went abroad to try and rally support from the Danes leaving his wife Emma in charge of the garrison. The support failed to materialise and the rebellion was put down. The siege lasted three months and ended when Emma secured promises that she and her garrison would be unharmed and given safe passage out of the country.

Norwich is one of 48 castles mentioned in the Domesday Survey of 1086. Estimates suggest that between 17 and 113 houses were destroyed in the building of the castle. Excavations in the late 1970s discovered that the castle bailey was built over a Saxon cemetery. The historian Robert Liddiard remarks that "to glance at the urban landscape of Norwich, Durham or Lincoln is to be forcibly reminded of the impact of the Norman invasion". Until the construction of Orford Castle in the mid-12th century under Henry II, Norwich was the only major royal castle in East Anglia.

By about 1100, the motte had been made higher and the surrounding ditch deepened. The stone keep, which stands today, was built on the south west part of the motte between 1094 and 1121. The keep internally had two floors. The entrance was to the upper floor on the eastern side, accessed via an external stone stairway to a forebuilding which became known as Bigod Tower. An area of land surrounding the castle, known as the Castle Fee was immediately brought under royal control, probably for defensive purposes.

During the Revolt of 1173–1174, in which Henry II's sons rebelled and started a civil war, Norwich Castle was put in a state of readiness. Hugh Bigod, 1st Earl of Norfolk, one of the more powerful earls, joined the revolt against Henry. Bigod landed 318 Flemish soldiers in England in May 1174 and with 500 of his own men advanced on and captured Norwich Castle. Fourteen prisoners were held for ransom. When peace was restored later that year, Norwich was returned to royal control.

The castle provided sanctuary to Jews fleeing the violence that erupted against them across East Anglia in Lent 1190, and which reached Norwich on 6 February (Shrove Tuesday). Those Jews unable to find safety inside the castle were massacred.

The Pipe Rolls, records of royal expenditure, note that repairs were carried out at the castle in 1156–1158 and 1204–1205. Thomas de Burgh (English: /dəˈbɜːr/ də-BUR, French: [dəbuʁ]; c. 1170 – ?), younger brother of William de Burgh, Lord of Connacht and Hubert de Burgh, Earl of Kent, and older brother of Geoffrey de Burgh, Bishop of Ely, became the castellan in 1215.

=== The castle as a prison ===
Parts of Norwich castle were used as a prison from an early stage; a gaol was made in the castle which serviced the wider county. State prisoners were confined in this gaol in 1264 and 1274. Sometimes the earl in charge of a royal castle refused to allow the sheriff to imprison convicted criminals therein, even though it had been customary to do so. In 1340, an Act of Parliament was passed that gave sheriffs control over the prisons within royal castles. From this time, Norwich castle became the public gaol of the county of Norfolk. The king retained ownership of the castle and continued to appoint a constable to look after it in his name.

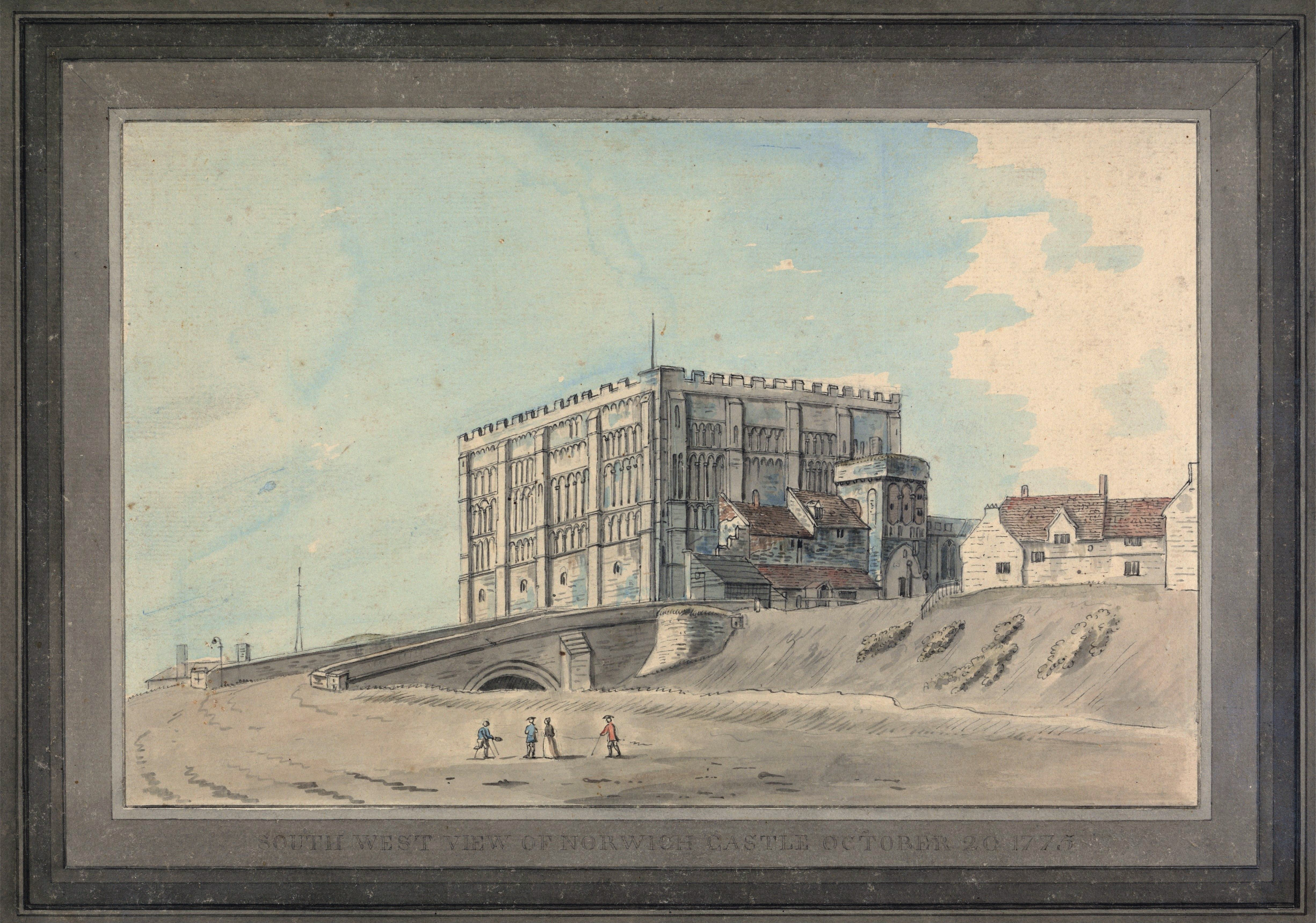
South-west view of the castle: watercolour and pen-and-ink drawing by Francis Grose, 20 October 1775

By the 18th century, the stone of the castle had blackened, its battlements had decayed, and the castle ditch was being used for rubbish disposal. The prison reformer John Howard visited six times between 1773 and 1782. He recorded the highest number of inmates at 53; split between felons and debtors. Howard described an upper gaol with ten cells, a low gaol and a dungeon restricted to male felons. He was especially critical of the limited separate facilities for women prisoners.

John Soane rebuilt the prison between 1789 and 1793. The interior walls of the keep were removed and cells for the male felons built. The debtors and women prisoners were accommodated in a new building adjoining the east side of the keep. This building incorporated but obscured the traditional entrance to the keep, the Bigod Tower. This cost £15,000. Soane's design was heavily criticised by antiquarian and architect William Wilkins (1751–1815) in his essay in Archaeologia published by the Society of Antiquarians in 1796

... the East front, in which was the grand entrance, is grossly mutilated and entirely hidden by an additional building, that appears to have no kind of connection with it, and ... has totally destroyed its symmetry. ... [W]e have now only to lament, that the original style and purity of the building has been so palpably violated by this heavy excrescence ...

Wilkins continued by slating the gutted interior as

... equally ill managed; small courts surrounded by lofty buildings, which almost ... totally, exclude every cheering ray of the sun from its wretched inhabitants. The felon, the prisoner untried, the debtor, and the gaoler, the guilty, and the innocent, share in the calamity.

In the 18th century, the castle mound was being used by the city's inhabitants as a soil quarry and rubbish dump. Norwich Justices of the Peace petitioned the House of Commons for the fee simple of the castle, the shirehall and surrounding grounds to be vested in them. This was granted by Act of Parliament on 12 July 1806, thereby ending more than 700 years of royal ownership, and vesting the Castle in the Magistrates of Norfolk as a county gaol. The authorities soon deemed Soane's prison inadequate and it was extensively remodelled by Wilkins's son, also named William Wilkins. The building work was completed by 1827 or 1828, costing £50,000. Models and plans of the site show that Wilkins retained Soane's U-shape structure within the keep but demolished Soane's adjoining building and the 1749 rebuilt Elizabethan Shirehall or Sessions House on the north side of the keep. Prisoner accommodation was extended across the top of the castle mound by new wings radiating from a central gaoler's house. This governor's house was octagonal, containing apartments for the gaoler's family, a prison chapel and a committee room, and featuring views over the three wings and the yards. 240 cells were in these wings, with 36 cells in the castle keep. A mill house with a treadwheel was installed to the right of the entrance, pumping water for use in the castle. A new Shirehall was designed by Wilkins in Tudor style and built at the north east foot of the castle hill in Market Avenue. Prisoners would be escorted from the castle cells, down spiral stairs and along a foot tunnel to the crown court in the shirehall.

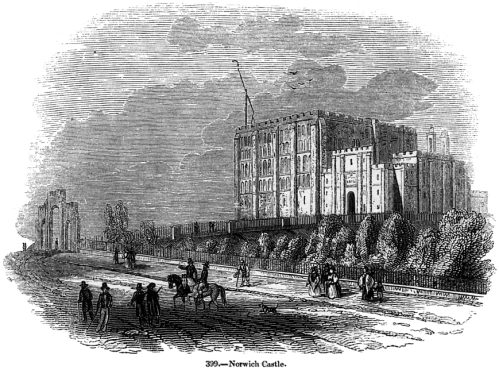
A mid-19th-century engraving of Norwich Castle from Charles Knight's Old England: A Pictorial Museum (1845).

Prison labour involved weaving matting and making sacks, prison clothing and shoes. In 1862, 134 average daily prisoners were in the gaol, with a total of 862 within that year. 103 of these were debtors. Officers of the gaol numbered around 20, including a governor, surgeon, chaplain, schoolmaster, engineer, matron, turnkeys, taskmaster and porter. The castle ceased to be used as a gaol in 1887, following the opening of HMP Norwich on a site adjacent to the Britannia Barracks at Mousehold Heath; a transfer of all prisoners to this site occurred on 2 August 1887.

=== Executions ===
A gallows was erected on the bridge behind the entrance lodges to the castle; felons were either executed publicly at these gallows or privately within the gaol. The bodies of those executed were automatically handed over to the surgeon of the gaol until the Anatomy Act 1832, after which their burials were conducted within the castle's precincts or at St Michael-at-Thorn church. "Hempnall Poisoner" Charles Daines was the last of these executed felons to be buried at St Michael-at-Thorn in April 1837. After Daines, all of the 16 felons executed at the castle were buried in an open area between the granite walls and the brick buildings of the castle complex, marked with a stone in the wall above listing their initials and the date of execution. The last public execution took place in 1867, after which a gallows on the north side of the keep was used. George Harmer was the last person to be executed at the gaol on 13 December 1866.

==== Robert Kett ====
A wall plaque placed at the entrance to the Museum in 1949 commemorates the 400th anniversary of the execution of Robert Kett. The plaque reads

... this memorial was placed here by the citizens of Norwich in reparation and honour to a notable and courageous leader in the long struggle of the common people of England to escape from a servile life into the freedom of just conditions.

Kett and his brother William were accused of high treason as leaders of a peasant revolt now known as Kett's Rebellion. After capture in Norfolk the brothers were held at the Tower of London and indicted. A special commission of oyer and terminer found both guilty and they were brought back to Norfolk for execution; Robert in Norwich and William in Wymondham. On 7 December 1549 at the behest of Edward VI Robert was 'drawn' from the Guildhall to the Castle and taken up to the battlements on the west face to be hanged in chains from a gibbet. A figurative roundel by sculptor James Woodford that decorates the central bronze entrance door to Norwich City Hall depicts the hanging.

==== James Rush ====
James Blomfield (or Bloomfield) Rush was hanged at the Castle for the double murder of Norwich Recorder, Isaac Jermy and his son at Stanfield Hall near Wymondham on 28 November 1848. The crime, trial and execution excited national as well as local interest. Rush was held in the Castle gaol from early December. His trial took place at the Norwich Assizes and a guilty verdict was pronounced on 4 April 1849. The convicted felon was marched to the scaffold at noon on 21 April 1849 and despatched by hangman William Calcraft in front of thousands of spectators.

=== Conversion to museum and art gallery ===
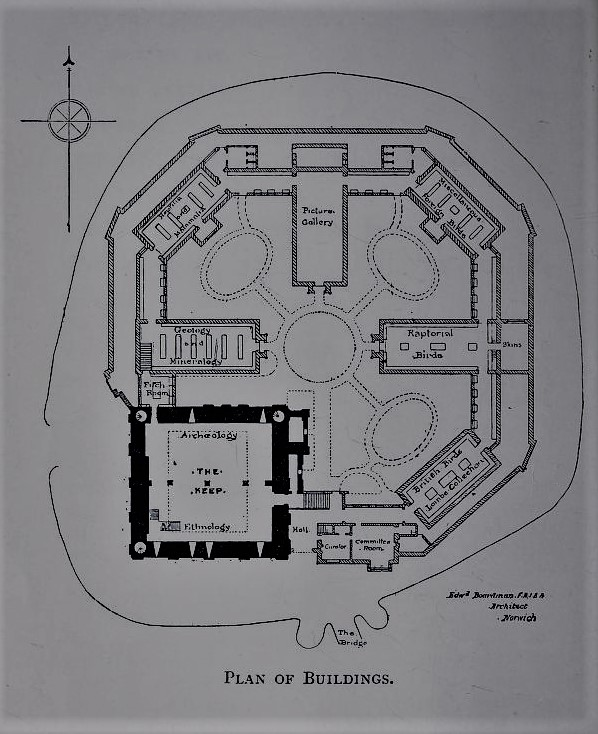
Boardman's plan for Norwich Castle Museum

The castle was bought by the city of Norwich to be used as a museum. The conversion was undertaken by Edward Boardman. Soane's cell complex within the keep was swept away and flooring and balconies installed. Norman style arches were built to support the new glazed roof. Wilkins's central gaoler's house and walled prisoner exercise yards made way for gardens and the cell blocks were converted to viewing galleries. The museum was officially opened by the Duke and Duchess of York on 23 October 1894.

At 12:25 pm on 20 February 2012, a group of four men entered the museum, forced open a display case, and attempted to steal a rhinoceros head, planning to sell its horns. They were tackled by two members of staff and stopped from stealing the head. The horns on the head were replaced with replicas before it was put back on display. Five days after the attempted rhino head theft, Admiral Lord Nelson artefacts valued at £36,800, including medals, a gold mourning ring worth £25,000, a box of medallions, and a saucer from his tea service, were stolen from the museum.

=== Royal Palace Reborn project ===
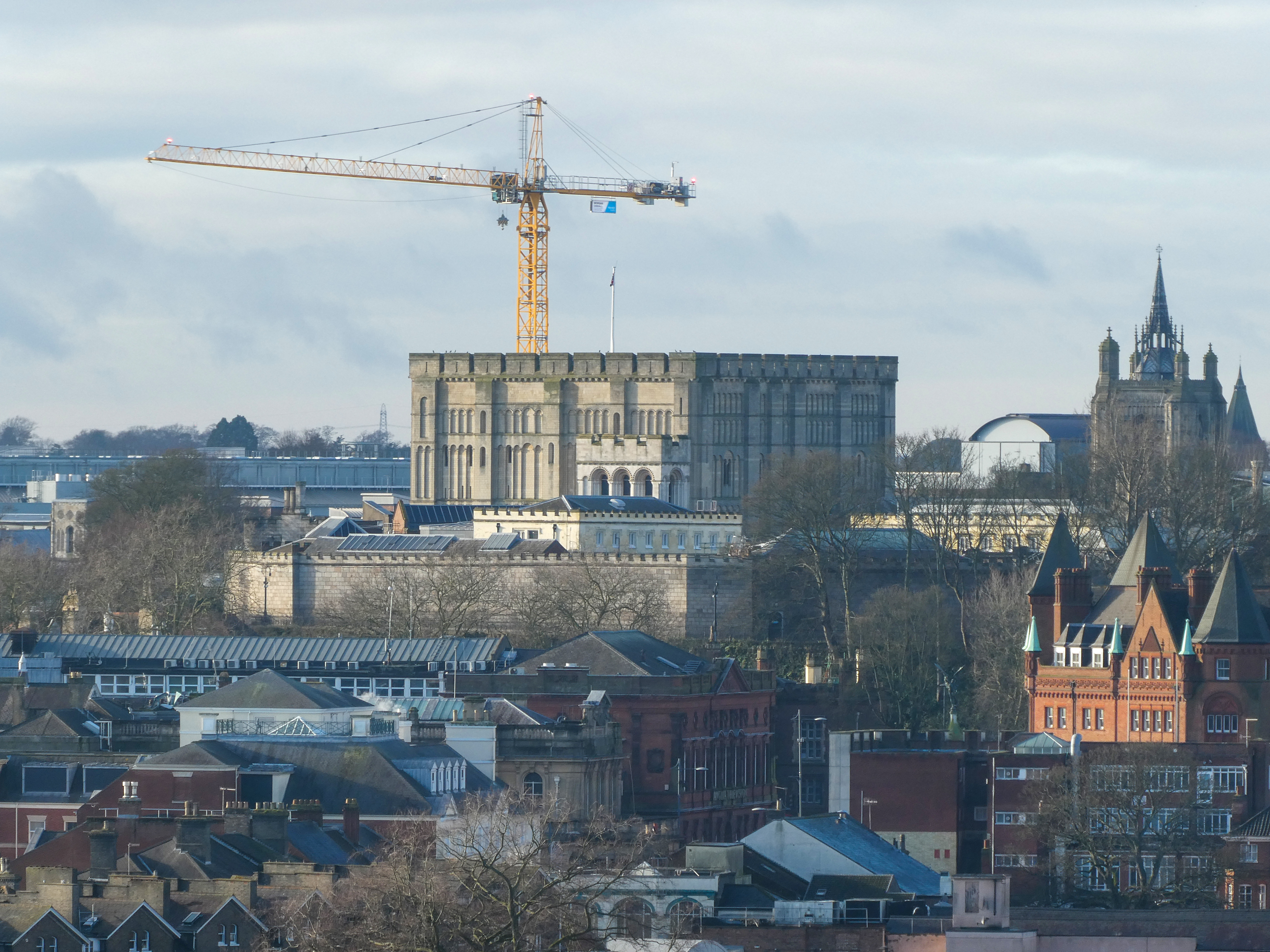
The Castle Keep undergoing restoration works in 2021

After five years of reconstruction Norwich Castle was reopened in August 2025. The £27m redevelopment project - titled "Royal Palace Reborn " - funded mainly by the National Lottery Heritage Fund (£13m) and Norfolk County Council was delayed by the Covid pandemic and discoveries during the rebuilding. Work started in 2020 with an expected completion in 2022. Later additions to the building were removed exposing the eastern wall of the keep and a new entrance. The rebuilding included accessibility provisions for visitors to see all five floors including full access to the battlements. A new lift allows wheelchair access and there is a tactile map to help blind and partially blind visitors.

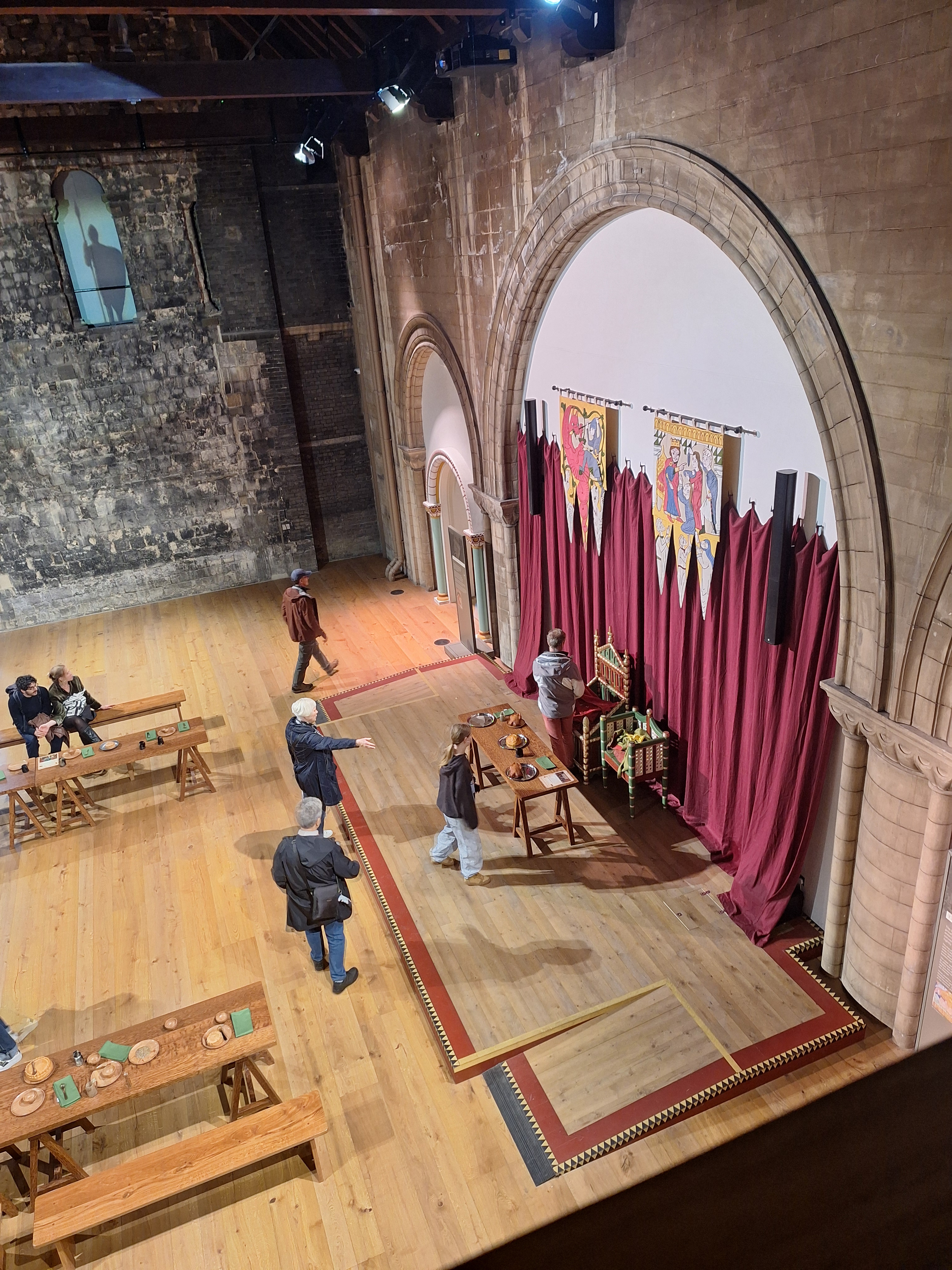
The recreated banquet hall with a throne in 2025

The interior of the keep was removed and floors reinstated in their original position with partitions to recreate the rooms including The Great Chamber, a banquet hall and medieval communal toilets. The interiors of the rooms are furnished and decorated. Medieval clothing is available for visitors to wear. Animations describing its original origins are projected on walls of the keep. The museum handbook says “The newly transformed spaces now enable visitors to see and explore the rooms of the royal palace, filled with the types of furniture, textiles and painted decoration that could have greeted Henry I when he stayed in Norwich in 1121”. A new Gallery of Medieval Life in partnership with the British Museum (Note: With 50 items on long term loan from the British Museum, it is "the largest display of the British Museum’s medieval collection outside of London") housing over 900 items is below the recreated rooms.

A Channel Four documentary The Castle: Rebuilding History by the Norwich company "Eye Film" on the reconstruction, narrated by Stephen Fry, was broadcast in August 2025 and also screened in some cinemas.

== Architecture ==
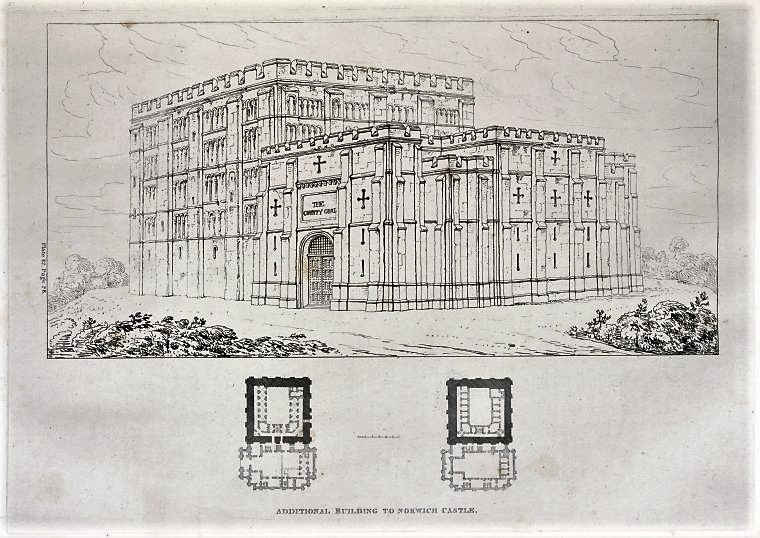
Architectural drawing by John Soane of his extension to Norwich Castle prison (completed 1793).

G. T. Clark, a 19th-century antiquary and engineer, described Norwich's great tower as "the most highly ornamented keep in England". It was originally faced with Caen stone over a flint core. The keep is some 95 ft (29 m) by 90 ft (27 m) and 70 ft (21 m) high, and is of the hall-keep type, entered at first floor level through an external structure called the Bigod Tower. The exterior is decorated with blank arcading. Castle Rising, also in Norfolk, is the only other comparable keep in this respect. Internally, the keep had been gutted so that nothing remains of its medieval layout. The uncertainty surrounding the keep's arrangement has led to scholarly debate. What is agreed on is that it had a complex domestic arrangement, with a kitchen, chapel, a two-storey high hall, and 16 latrines. The original Norman bridge over the inner ditch was replaced in around 1825.

=== Refacing of the keep ===
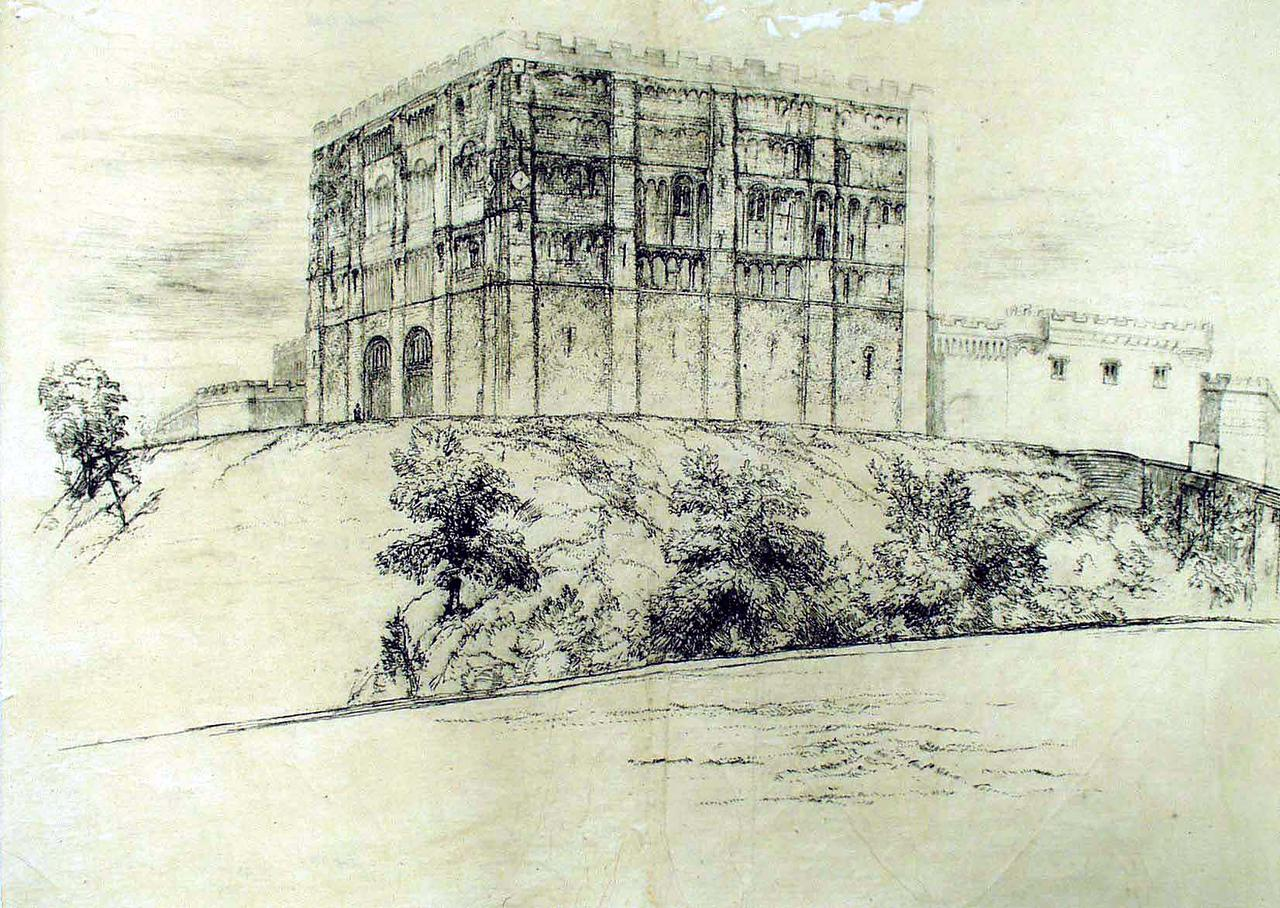
Edward Thomas Daniell, Norwich Castle – before the restoration of 1834 (Norfolk Museums Collections)

The outer shell of the keep was extensively repaired in 1835–1839 by the architect Anthony Salvin. Stonemason James Watson completely refaced the keep with Bath stone, faithfully reproducing the original ornamentation. The etcher and watercolourist Edward Thomas Daniell was one of the vociferous opponents of the refacing. A letter he wrote published in the Norwich Mercury in August 1830 referred to the "scandalous re-facing of the ancient keep". Although Daniell was living in London during this period, letters to his friends the artist Henry Ninham and the botanist Dawson Turner reveal the extent of his opposition. In a letter to Turner, Daniell wrote, "I have had a very beautiful drawing made of it, and I mean to etch it the size of the drawing. I can only say that if my etching be half as much like the castle, or half as good as the drawing, it will be more like, than anything yet done, of that very beautiful relic." To Ninham he wrote, "Show me by a plan, how high they have got pulling down, and enable me to judge whether even now in the eleventh hour, any good can be done; and I in return will just inform you, how I stand with regard to my plate. It stands precisely as it did when I left Norwich." His etching of the old keep, however, was never completed.

== Norwich Castle Museum and Art Gallery ==
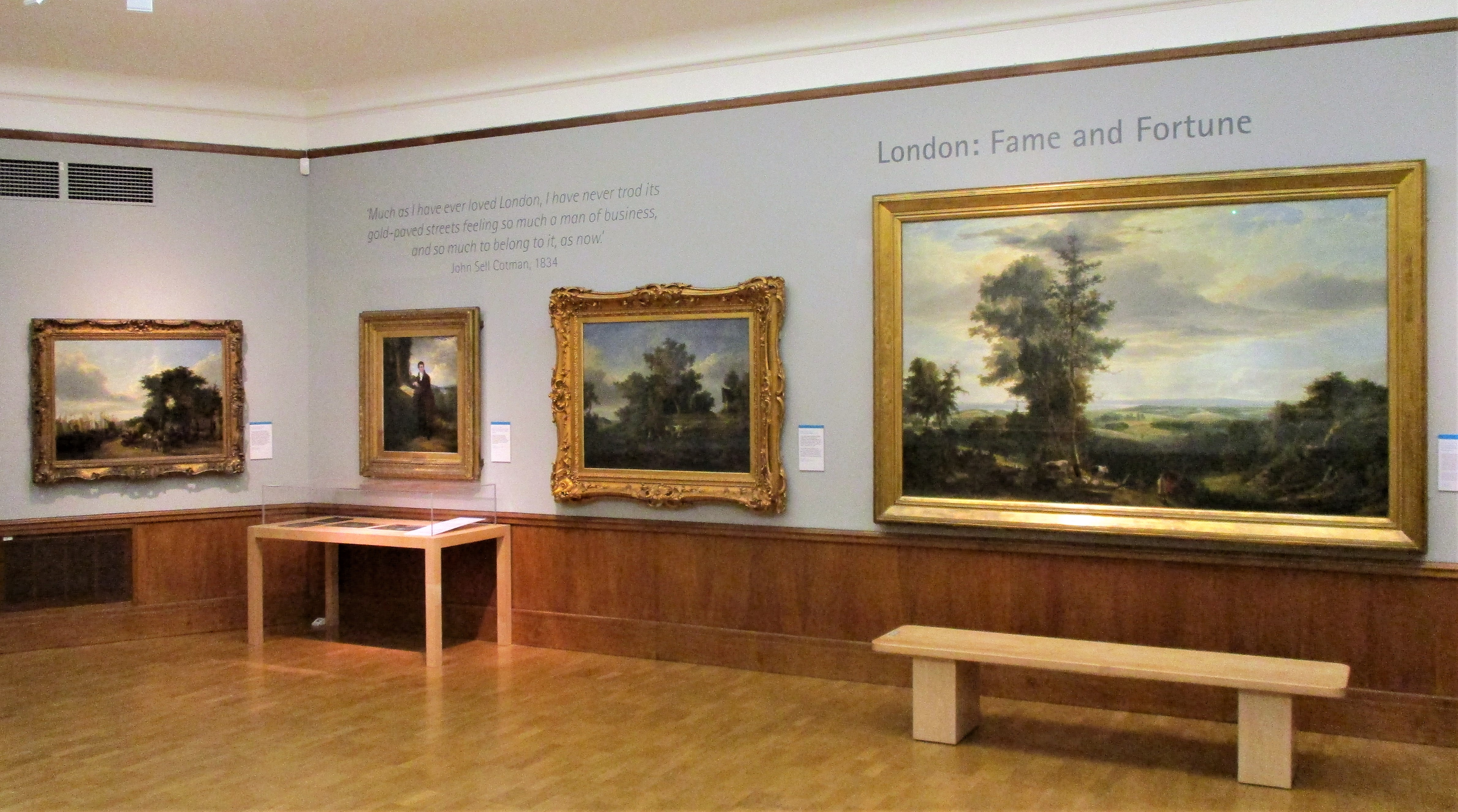
Nineteenth century paintings of the Norwich school of painters, including John Sell Cotman, on display

The castle remains a museum and art gallery and still contains many of its first exhibits. The museum's fine art collection includes costumes, textiles, jewellery, glass, ceramics and silverware, and a large display of ceramic teapots. The fine art galleries feature works by the early 19th century Norwich School of painters as well as English watercolour paintings, Dutch landscapes and modern British paintings from the 17th to 20th centuries. The castle also houses a good collection of the work of the Flemish artist Peter Tillemans. Other galleries include Boudica and the Romans, the Anglo-Saxons (including the Harford Farm Brooch) and Natural History which displays the Fountaine–Neimy butterfly collection. An unusual artefact is the needlework by Lorina Bulwer at the turn of the twentieth century whilst she was confined in a workhouse. The work has featured on BBC television.

=== Collection highlights ===
==== Paintings ====
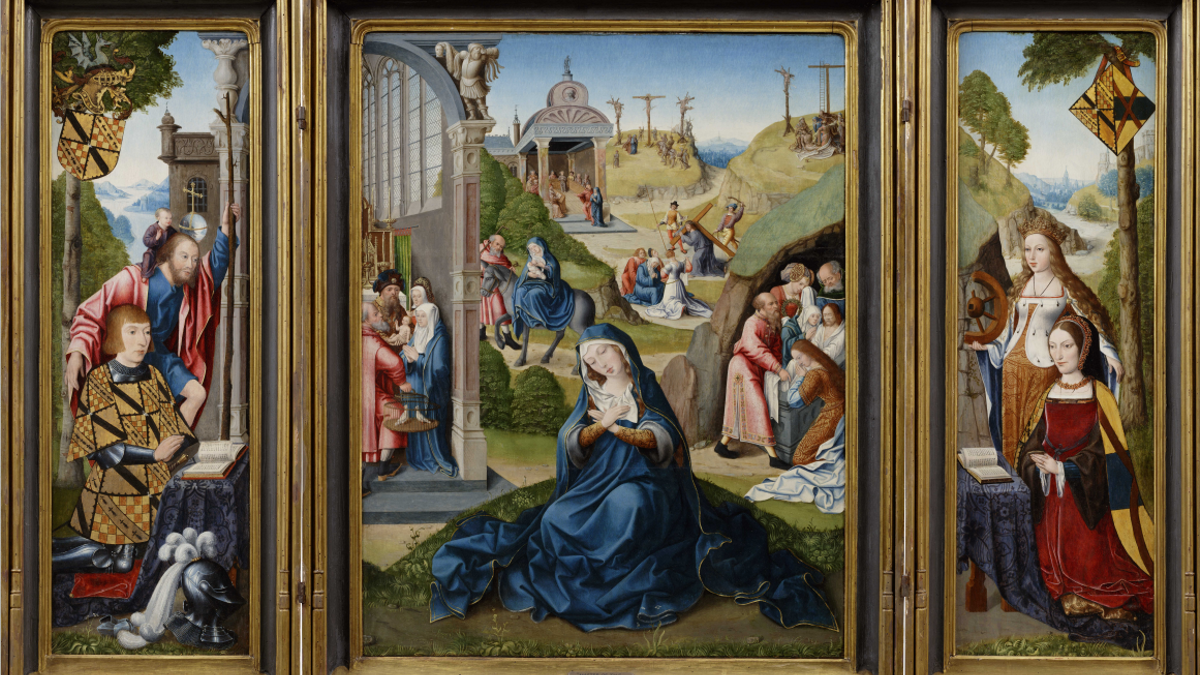
The Ashwellthorpe Triptych.

Also known as The Seven Sorrows of Mary, the Ashwellthorpe Triptych has significant connections with South Norfolk and its long trading tradition with Holland. This Flemish altarpiece was commissioned by the Norfolk family of the Knyvettes of Ashwellthorpe. Christopher Knyvettes was sent by King Henry VIII to the Netherlands in 1512, when he commissioned this painting to Master of the Legend of the Magdalen. Both Christopher and his wife Catherina are represented kneeling to Mary, mother of Jesus in the foreground of the composition, showing their religious devotion and wealth.

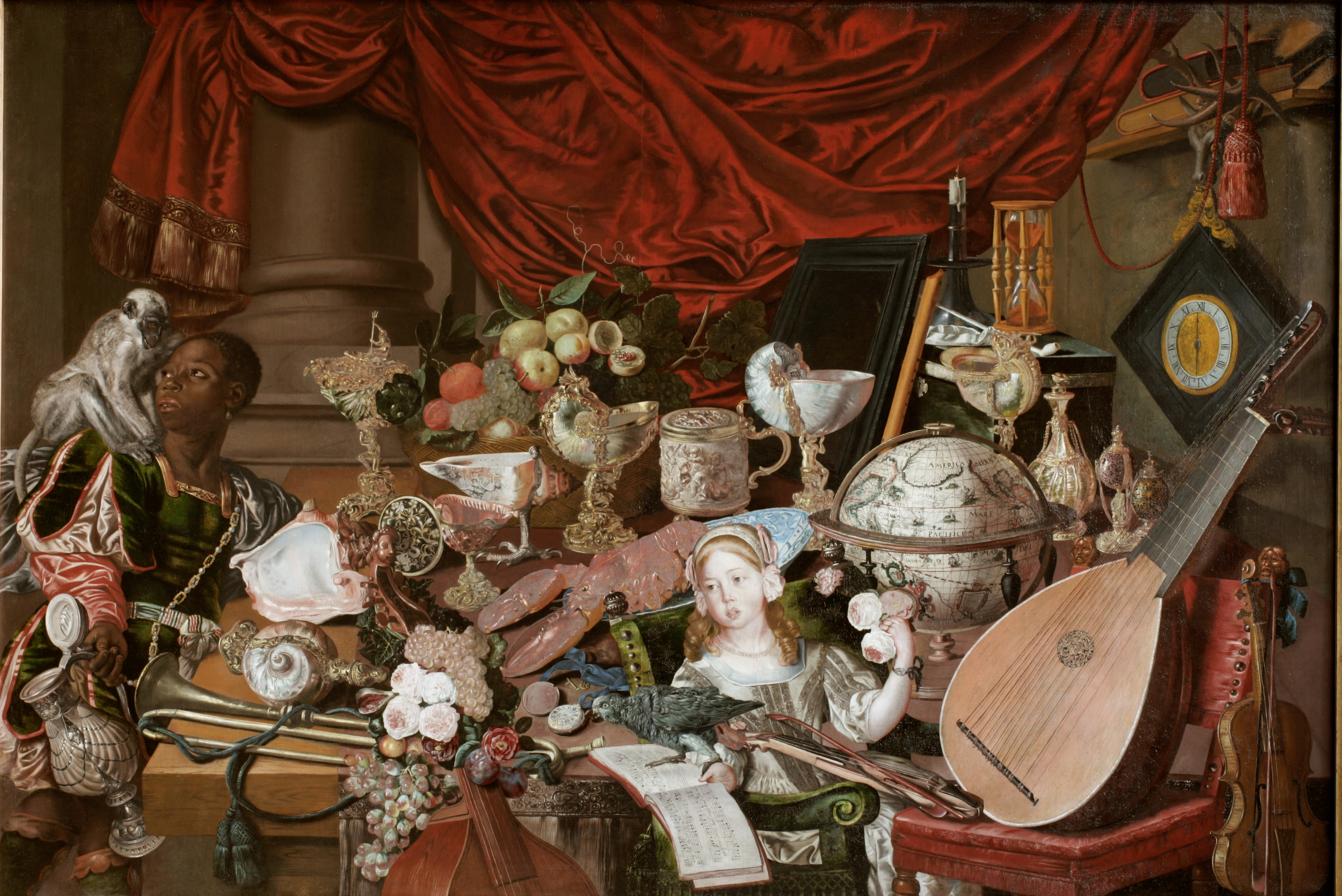
The Paston Treasure, c. 1663 oil on canvas, 165 × 246.5 cm.

The Paston Treasure is a painting commissioned around 1663 either by Sir William Paston (1610–1663), or by his son Robert (1631–1683). The identity of the artist is unknown, however it is likely that it was a Dutch artist working in a studio at the principal residence of the Pastons at Oxnead. The artwork can be placed within the mid-seventeenth century Dutch still life tradition, with elements that conform to the genre of vanitas. Still life paintings usually feature one or two objects which are artists' stock items, included only for their symbolism. On the other hand, the majority of the objects represented in The Paston Treasure were all real, as they correspond to an existing item in the inventories of the Pastons'. Therefore, it was not exclusively commissioned as a memento mori, but also as a record for the family's wealth and own collection and perhaps commemorative of the death of family member, William Paston. In 2018, the painting formed the centre piece of an exhibition curated by Francesca Vanke, The Paston Treasure: Riches & Rarities of the Known World. The exhibition reunited the painting with some of the objects depicted for the first time in nearly three hundred years.

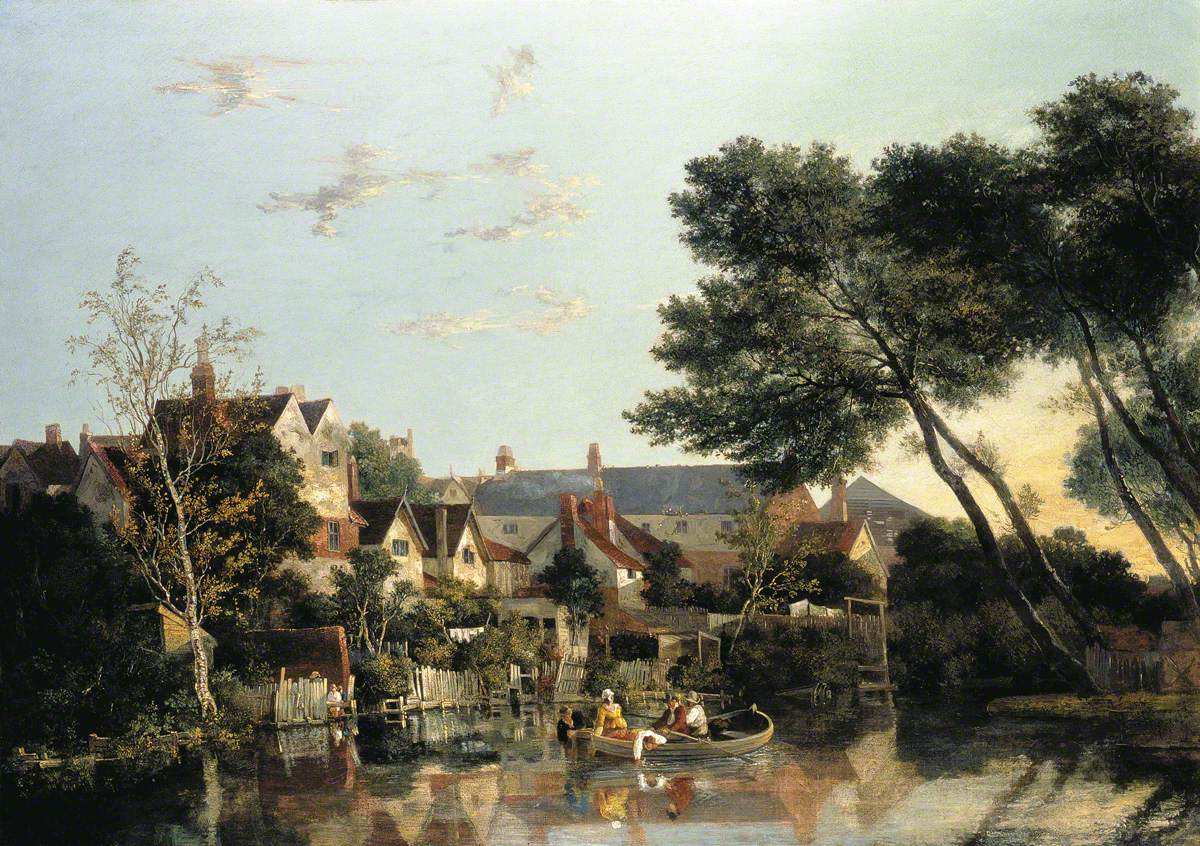
Norwich River: Afternoon by John Crome.

Norwich River: Afternoon is an oil on canvas painting by the Norwich School of Painters artist John Crome. The Norwich Society of Artists was founded in 1803 by Crome and Robert Ladbrooke and brought together professional painters and drawing masters such as John Sell Cotman, James Stark, George Vincent as well as other talented amateur artists, who were often inspired by the East Anglian landscape, and were influenced by Dutch landscape painters. This painting is considered one of the finest works made by Crome. It depicts the River Wensum near New Mills at St Martin's Oak, close to where the artist lived in Norwich.

==== Artifacts ====
The Happisburgh hand axe is made of flint, and measures 12.2 cm × 7.8 cm. The discovery of this Lower Palaeolithic hand axe in 2000 along the Norfolk coast at Happisburgh transformed our understanding of early human occupation in Britain. Dated and shown to be 500,000 years old, it is amongst the oldest handaxes ever discovered in the UK. Analysis of pollen in the silt allowed the archaeologists to build a picture of temperate woodland with the existence of pine, alder, oak, elm and hornbeam trees in evidence at the time the handaxe was made.

Torcs were a characteristic neck ring used in the Iron Age across Europe. They would have been worn by prominent people within society as a symbol of status and power. The rare tubular gold torc known as the Gold Tubular Torc came from the Snettisham Treasure. It was found in 1948 at Snettisham, alongside a large number of other torcs, carefully disposed in the ground, confirming that burial rituals had great significance within the people of Late Iron Age Norfolk.

Present among the museum's collection is a copy of the death mask of Guiseppe Marco Fieschi, who in 1835 attempted to assassinate Louis Phillipe, the last King of France. The mask shows evidence of the facial and head injuries he received during the attempt.

The Cavalry Parade Helmet and Visor was found in the River Wensum at Worthing in 1947 and 1950 respectively. The items, of Roman origin, date to the first half of the third century CE. They are an important testimony of the presence of Roman army personnel in central Norfolk during the later period of the Roman occupation. The helmet is made from a single sheet of gilded bronze, highly decorated as to represent a feathered eagle's head on the crest, foliate-tailed beasts on either side and a plain triangular front panel with feather borders on either side at the top, with the lower ends terminating in birds' heads. The visor mask complements the helmet by carrying similar repoussé decoration, depicting Mars on one side and Victory on the other. These two objects are not a fitting pair, although they can be considered together as each would have originally had been coupled with a similar complementary object.

The unique Anglo-Saxon ceramic figurine now known as Spong Man was found in 1979 in Spong Hill. The figure, dating to between 500-600 AD, is shown sat on a chair decorated with incised panelling and is leaning forwards with head in hands wearing a round flat hat. It is likely to have once sat on the lid of a pagan funerary urn and is a unique object in North Western Europe. Although it is labelled as a man, its gender is unclear, as there are no distinctive anatomic details. Exactly why this figurine was created is still a mystery. It is the earliest Anglo-Saxon three-dimensional figure ever found. It may be a representation of a deity whose identity is now lost, but it is still a great artifact that reminds us how little we know about religion in this early migration period across northern Europe.

In May 2025, the West Norfolk Hoard was acquired by the museum. It is the largest hoard of Anglo-Saxon coins in England, made up of 132 gold coins and four gold objects dating to around 610 AD, found in West Norfolk. It went on display in the museum's newly reopened Anglo-Saxon and Viking Gallery.

Part of a quartet of rare examples of English medieval art, the stained-glass roundel depicting December is an example of the Norwich School of stained-glass. It shows clear Flemish influences, and it is possible that it has been made by one of the Norwich Strangers, immigrants of the sixteenth century from the Low Countries. It is thought to have been made for the Major Thomas Pykerell's house. originally there would have been twelve roundels depicting the Labours of The Months, a popular pageant in Norwich during that period. This roundel in particular depicts the King of Christmas. Of the original twelve only four now survive, depicting December, September, probably March and either April or November.

Dragons in England are famous through the legend of Saint George, however, they have always been particular important in Norwich since the medieval period. The Norwich Snapdragon was made to reflect the civil power and wealth of the city within Norfolk and was used during a procession which combined the celebration of the city's saint and the installation of the new major of the town. The Snapdragon at the Norwich Castle, known as Snap, is the last complete example of the civic snapdragon. Like all others, it was built to contain one person, its body is made of basketwork, painted with gold and red scales over a green body and red underside, while the person's legs were hidden within a canvas 'skirt'.

The museum holds the remains of a gibbet cage and two skull fragments of Stephen Watson. Watson was hung in Thetford in 1795, and then gibbeted on common land between the parishes of West Bradenham and Holme Hale; these artefacts were later found by the novelist H. Rider Haggard in 1899 and given to the museum.

The Norfolk Regiment First World War Casualty Book is a unique graphic record of the Norfolk Regiment's participation in the First World War. It records details of more than 15,000 soldiers from the regular and service battalions in 1914 to their return home in 1919. Each entry of the book contains the soldier's name, service number, battalion and details of their health. It also records those who perished in action.

The castle holds a teapot collection of over 2 and a half thousand pots largely sourced from the collections of Bulwer and Miller families. Part of the collection is displayed in the Twining Teapot Gallery.

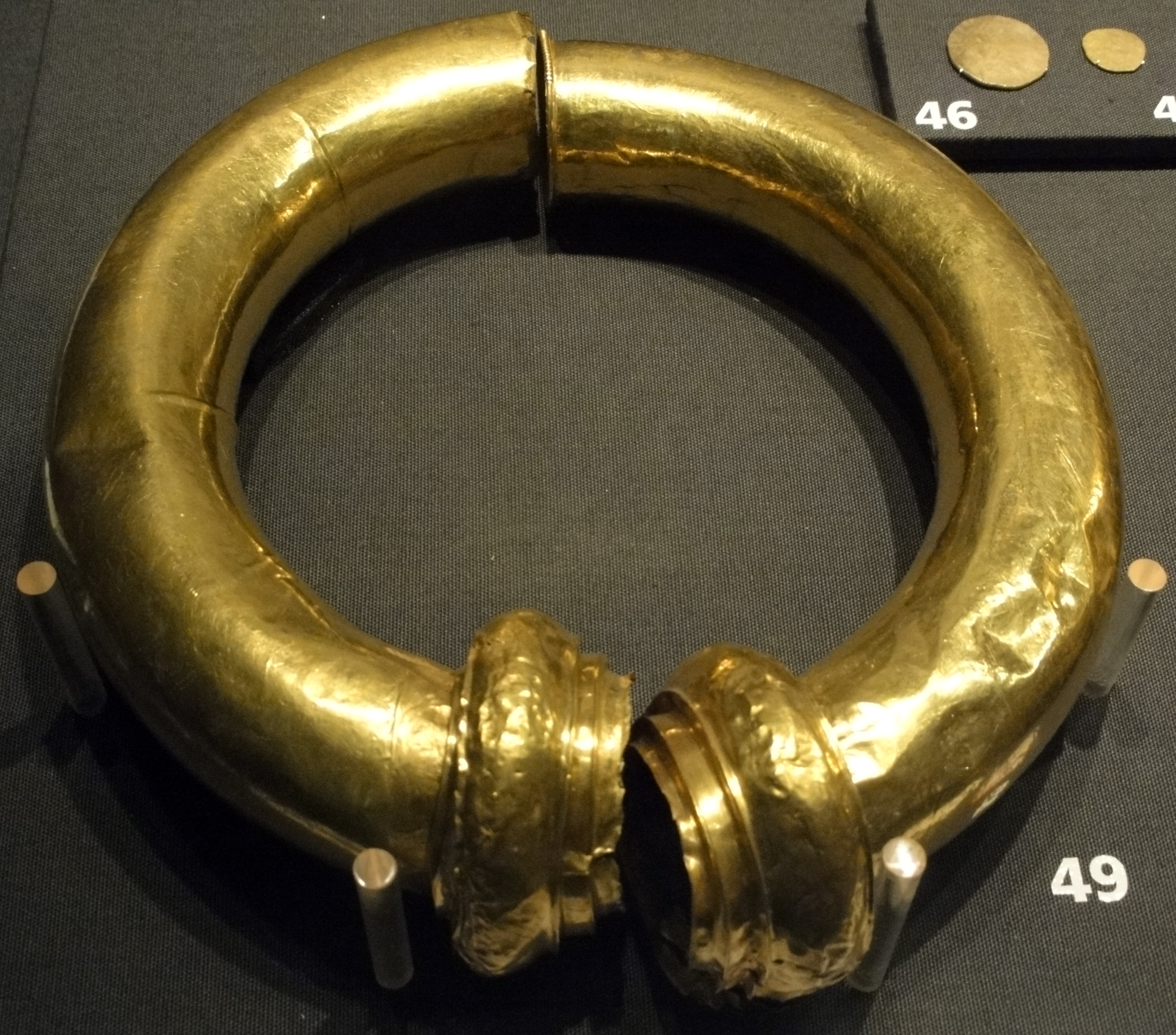
A tubular gold torc, one of the torcs of the Snettisham Hoard on display at the Norwich Castle Museum

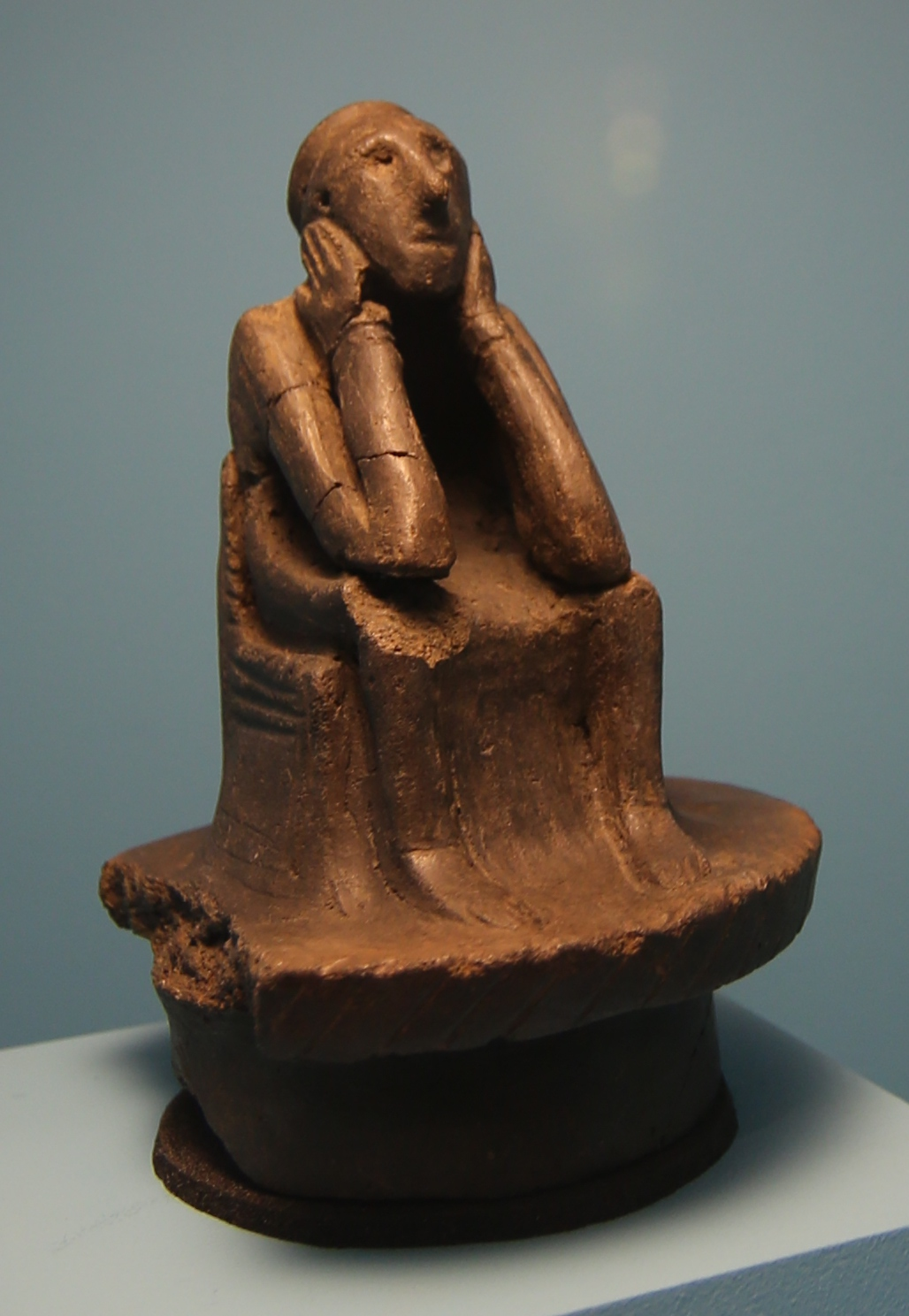
Spong Man. AD 500–600. Height 14.0 cm.

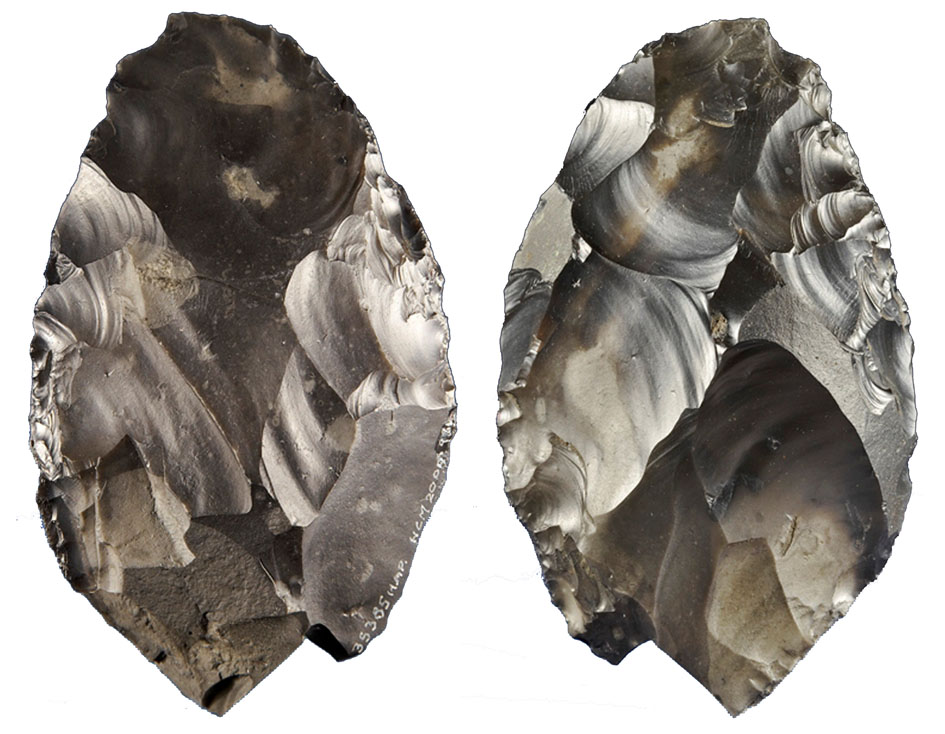
The Happisburgh Handaxe, flint. 12.2 × 7.8 cm.

== Bibliography ==
- Allen Brown, Reginald (1976) [1954], Allen Brown's English Castles, Woodbridge: The Boydell Press, ISBN 1-84383-069-8
- Beecheno, Frederick R. (1889). E.T. Daniell: a memoir. Privately printed (Limited edition of 50 copies). OCLC 27318993.
- Campbell, J. (1 February 2004). "The Building of Orford Castle: A Translation from the Pipe Rolls, 1163–78". English Historical Review. 119 (480): 164. doi:10.1093/ehr/119.480.164-a.
- Cathcart King, David James (1983), Castellarium Anglicanum: An Index and Bibliography of the Castles in England, Wales and the Islands. Volume II: Norfolk–Yorkshire and the Islands, London: Kraus International Publications, ISBN 0-527-50110-7
- Clark, George Thomas (1881). "The castles of England and Wales at the Latter part of the Twelfth Century". The Archaeological Journal. 38: 258–276, 335–351. doi:10.1080/00665983.1881.10851987.
- Davis, John A.; Pestell, Tim (2015), A History of Norfolk in 100 Objects, The History Press
- Dickes, William Frederick (1905). The Norwich school of painting: being a full account of the Norwich exhibitions, the lives of the painters, the lists of their respective exhibits and descriptions of the pictures. Norwich: Jarrold & Sons Ltd. OCLC 558218061 – via archive.org.
- Goodall, John (2011), The English Castle 1066–1650, London: Yale University Press, ISBN 978-0-300-11058-6
- Harfield, C. G. (1991). "A Hand-list of Castles Recorded in the Domesday Book". English Historical Review. 106 (419): 371–392. doi:10.1093/ehr/CVI.CCCCXIX.371. JSTOR 573107.
- Liddiard, Robert (2005), Castles in Context: Power, Symbolism and Landscape, 1066 to 1500, Macclesfield: Windgather Press Ltd, ISBN 0-9545575-2-2
- Madders, Susan Swain (1857). Fletcher's Norwich Handbook. Norwich: Josiah Fletcher.
- Pevsner, Nikolaus; Wilson, Bill (1997). Norfolk 1: Norwich and North East. Buildings of England (2nd ed.). Yale University Press. ISBN 9780300096071.
- Rawcliffe, Carole; Wilson, Richard (2006), Medieval Norwich, Continuum, ISBN 978-1-85285-546-8
- Renn, Derek F. (1968), Norman Castles in Britain, John Baker Publishers
- Russell, Frederic William (1859). Kett's rebellion in Norfolk. Longman.
- Skinner, Patricia (2003), The Jews in Medieval Britain: Historical, Literary, and Archaeological Perspectives, Boydell Press, ISBN 978-0-85115-931-7
- Vanke, Francesca. (2018), The Paston Treasure Riches & Rarities of the Known World, Norfolk Museum Service
- Wareham, Andrew (1994), "The Motives and Politics of the Bigod Family, c.1066–1177", Anglo-Norman Studies, XVII, The Boydell Press, ISSN 0954-9927
- Warren, W. L. (1973), Henry II, Eyre Methuen, ISBN 978-0-520-02282-9
- Webster, Leslie; Cherry, John (1980). "Medieval Britain in 1979" (PDF). Medieval Archaeology. 24: 218–264. doi:10.1080/00766097.1980.11735426.
