= Harford Farm Brooch =

7th-century Anglo-Saxon disk brooch

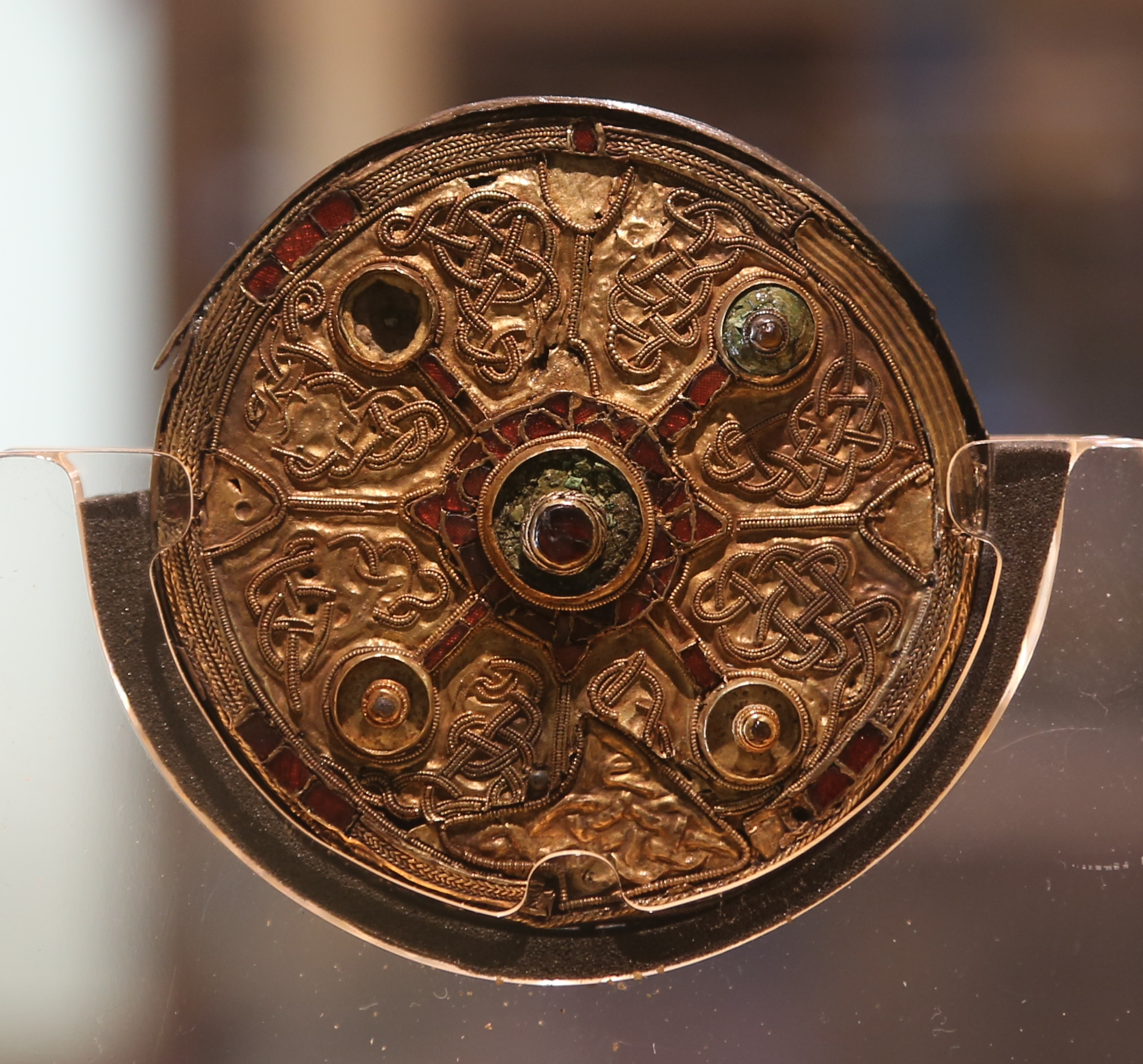
Harford Farm Brooch

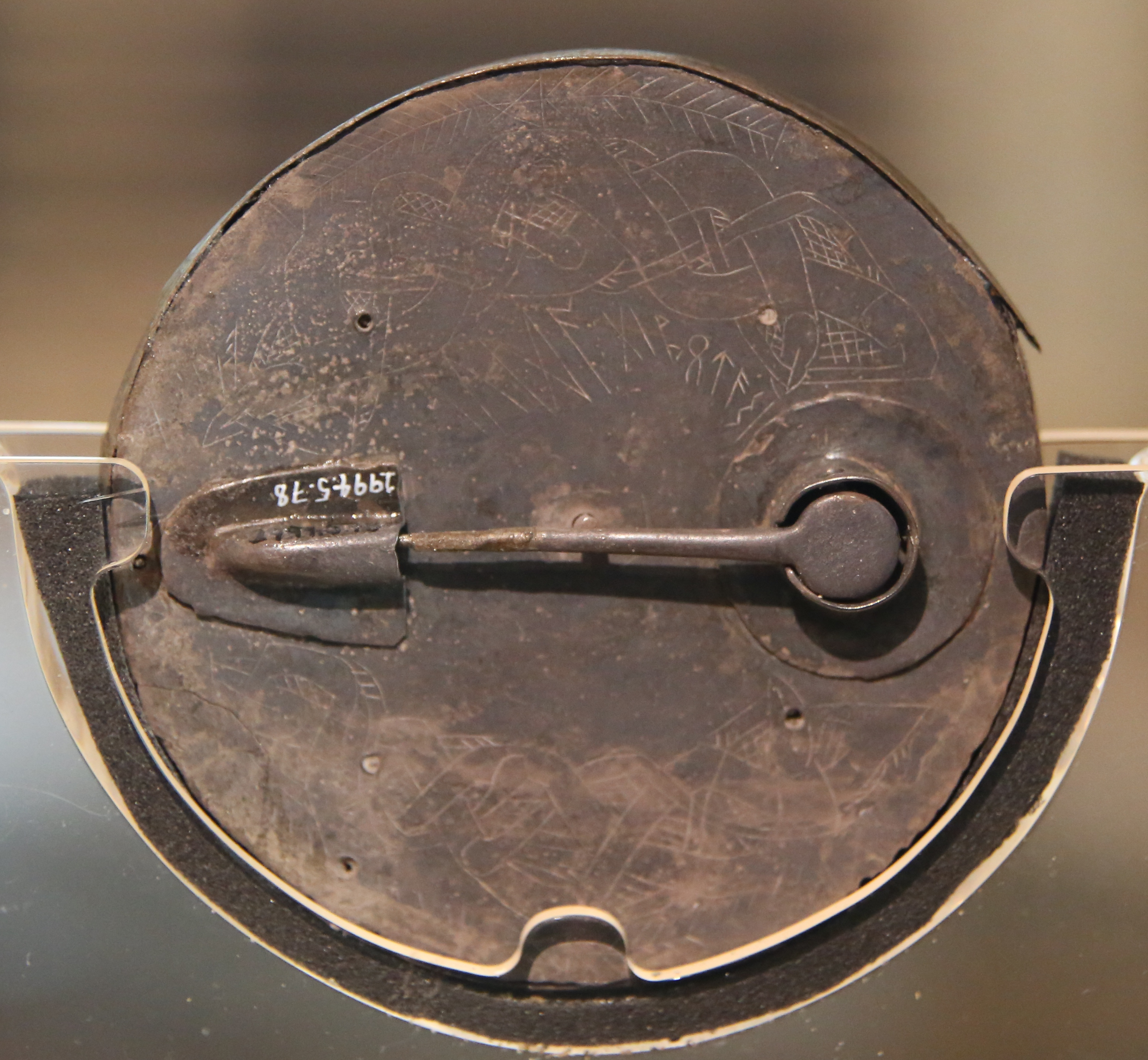
The back of the brooch

The Harford Farm Brooch is a 7th-century Anglo-Saxon disk brooch. The brooch was originally made in Kent and was found along with a number of other artifacts during an excavation of an Anglo-Saxon cemetery at Harford Farm in Norfolk. The brooch measures 72 millimetres (2.8 in) across and was found in grave 11. The front of the brooch is gold decorated with glass and garnets while the backplate is silver. On the back of the brooch there is a runic inscription reading "ᛚᚢᛞᚪ:ᚷᛁᛒᛟᛏᚫᛋᛁᚷᛁᛚᚫ" (luda:gibœtæsigilæ), which Norfolk Museums & Archaeology Service translates as “Luda repaired the brooch”; however “may Luda make amends by means of the brooch” has been offered as a translation by Alfred Bammesberger in the journal Neophilologus. In addition to the runes, the back of the brooch also has a scratched zoomorphic decoration.

The brooch is now on display at Norwich Castle.
