= West Norfolk Hoard =

Anglo-Saxon hoard of coins

- Material: Gold
- Created: c. 610 AD
- Discovered: 1991–2020; West Norfolk
- Discovered by: Anonymous detectorist (1991); David Cockle (2012–2015); Anonymous individual (2020)
- Identification: NMS-934673

The West Norfolk Hoard is the largest hoard of Anglo-Saxon coins in England, comprising 132 gold coins and four gold objects dating to around 610 AD, all found over a period of 29 years in West Norfolk. Its origin is notably close in date to the Sutton Hoo burial, with some coins having been struck using the same dies as coins found in a purse at that site.

In May 2025, it was acquired by Norwich Castle Museum with funding by the National Heritage Memorial Fund, the Art Fund and The Wolfson Foundation. It went on display in the museum's newly reopened Anglo-Saxon and Viking Gallery.

== Contents ==
The large majority of the coins are Merovingian tremisses. Of those that can be traced, 3 are from Provincia, 5 from Frisia, 17 from Burgundia, 27 from Neustria, 29 from Austrasia, and 30 from Aquitania. The hoard also includes ten coins from the Byzantine Empire; nine solidi and one tremissis. One coin in the hoard was previously known only from an engraving in a book by a French writer which was published in 1666, and confirmed the coin's authenticity. Very few of the tremisses fall below 80% gold purity, with one exception being a plated forgery which is broken. Three of the coins are fitted with a suspension loop, making them into jewellery.

All the coins were likely minted on Continental Europe as the British Isles did not mint gold coins of its own; at least two of these coins were minted using the same dies as a number of coins from the Sutton Hoo purse hoard, itself dated to 625 AD. Multiple groups of coins within the West Norfolk Hoard were struck by the same dies as each other, and likely travelled together in parcels before joining the hoard; these groups and pairs originate from Maastricht, Javols, Les Cannacs, Mainz, Rouen, Strasbourg, Thiverzay and Windisch. While few can be dated, those which are dateable feature Byzantine emperors Justinian I (527–65), Justin II (565–78), Tiberius II Constantine (578–82) and Maurice Tiberius (582–602) as well as Frankish kings Theudebertus II (595–612) and Theudericus II (595–613).

Four other gold objects complete the hoard, which consist of a bracteate, a small bar with 44% gold and 48-50% silver content, and two probable jewellery fragments.

== History ==
The hoard was likely built up by a person who was moving around the Merovingian kingdom. The presence of gold items in the hoard other than coins suggests that their owner used them as bullion rather than as currency. The hoard was placed in about 610 AD, likely buried in a barrow due to its proximity to an Anglo-Saxon cemetery before being scattered by later ploughing.

== Finds ==
The discovery of all the coins in the hoard spans 29 years, from 1991 to 2020. The finds were deemed as being part of the same hoard on 3 November 2021, totalling to 131 coins and four gold objects.

=== 1991 anonymous finds ===
The first coin from the hoard, a tremissis, was discovered in 1991, and initially thought to be a stray find. An anonymous metal detectorist discovered 35 Merovingian coins at the site and declared them.

=== 2012–2015 David Cockle finds ===
Between April 2012 and December 2015, David Cockle, a 50-year-old police officer based at Downham Market police station, found 10 of the Merovingian Tremissis coins at the site, valued at about £4,000 each, and sold them to a dealer in three batches over 14 months for a total of £15,000, keeping the money. He had previously agreed to a 50:50 split of the proceeds with the farmer who owned the land for permission to be on the land, but he did not declare the finds to the farmer nor the Norfolk coroner who would have determined if the coins were treasure. Cockle had 30 years of experience as a metal detectorist.

The Norfolk and Suffolk Anti-Corruption Unit began an investigation after a member of the public reported him; he was arrested in November 2015, and charged with theft and three charges of handling criminal property in May 2016, after pictures of the stolen coins were found on his mobile phone which matched with coins stocked by a local coin dealer, who had already sold some of the coins. Cockle was suspended from Norfolk Constabulary the same month. He initially denied all charges, but later admitted to stealing the coins at Ipswich Crown Court in January 2017 on the first day of his trial. He was dismissed as a policeman by Norfolk Chief Constable Simon Bailey the next month following a misconduct hearing, who declared the incident as "one of the grossest breaches of trust". Cockle did not attend the hearing, though apologised in a written statement.

Cockle was jailed for 16 months and banned from metal detecting, owning metal detecting equipment, and entering into metal detecting agreements with landowners, for five years in March 2017. Judge Rupert Overbury stating that Cockle's motivation was "pure greed" and that he knew the legal process associated with such finds. In September, he was ordered to repay the £15,000 or face a further 9 months in prison.

=== 2014–2020 anonymous finds ===
The majority of the coins were found in a single field by an anonymous individual between 2014 and 2020.
