= Elizabethan Strangers =

Immigrant group from the Low Countries which settled in Norwich

The Elizabethan Strangers, usually referred to simply as the Strangers, were a group of Dutch and Walloon Protestant refugees who fled anti-Protestant policies, economic hardship and war in the Catholic Low Countries and settled in and around Norwich in England. The first group of around 300 migrants came from Flanders to Norwich in 1565 after being officially encouraged to do so, and many more followed, eventually making up an estimated 40 percent of the population of Norwich at their peak. More Strangers came to other nearby cities such as London, as well as smaller towns such as Colchester and Canterbury. The Strangers in Norwich were subject to a failed uprising against them in 1570, as well as increasing restrictions upon their worship under William Laud. Their population in records declined largely due to assimilation into the native population.

== Background ==
Emigration from the Low Countries was largely fuelled by anti-Protestant policies of the Habsburg ruler Philip II of Spain as well as economic hardship and war. Between 50,000 and 300,000 refugees sought religious freedom away from the Low Countries. Being Protestant, England appeared to be more tolerant. London and Southampton were destinations for these people, as well as Norwich.

== Resettlement to Norwich ==
=== Historical links ===
Links between Norwich and the Low Countries had already existed since the Middle Ages, such as a request from Philippa of Hainault for expert Flemish weaver John Kempe to reside in Norwich, which took place for several years. Evidence from wills also shows a Dutch and Flemish presence in Norwich prior to the 15th century, and in the late 1540s some Flemish weavers settled in Norwich.

Norwich had also been a large part of the extensive textile industry in woollens and worsted since the Middle Ages. Despite this history, the Norwich textile industry was in crisis by the 16th century; cheaper and higher quality merchandise from Flanders was strong competition for Norwich's fabrics.

=== Request for immigrant workers and first Strangers ===
In 1565, Norwich city authorities approached the Duke of Norfolk and asked for assistance to establish an alien community to stop the "decay" of the town and its worsted manufacture, hoping to revive the economy through the introduction of manufacturing "Flanders commodities made of wool". This request called for 30 master workers with up to 10 servants each, totalling 330 people.The Duke had contacts with Jan Utenhove, a leading figure in the Dutch Church, allowing for a speedy process. They sent a representative to Queen Elizabeth I and asked for permission for immigrant workers to settle in the city. She issued a royal "letters patent" at the Duke's expense in November 1565, allowing 30 named incomers and 10 members of their households, up to a maximum of 300 people, to settle in Norwich. Of the householders admitted, 24 were Dutch and 6 were Walloon.

Most of the 30 households entered England through Sandwich, Kent, and London churches aided in their resettlement. These began the officially sanctioned settlement of Strangers in Norwich.

Though both the Dutch and Walloon families were referred to as Strangers, they formed separate communities in the city. Upon first moving to the area, Strangers were subject to restrictions including controls over purchases and sales and an 8 p.m. curfew to prevent drunkenness and disorder. Friction took place when some Strangers refused to aid English apprentices or when they set up businesses in competing trades that were not textiles, such as tailoring and shoemaking. In response, several "politic men", or arbiters, were appointed to negotiate agreements between the Strangers and the authorities. Dutch printer Anthony de Solen was employed to publish official orders and decrees. Citizenship rights were offered to the immigrants of Norwich before those in any other town.

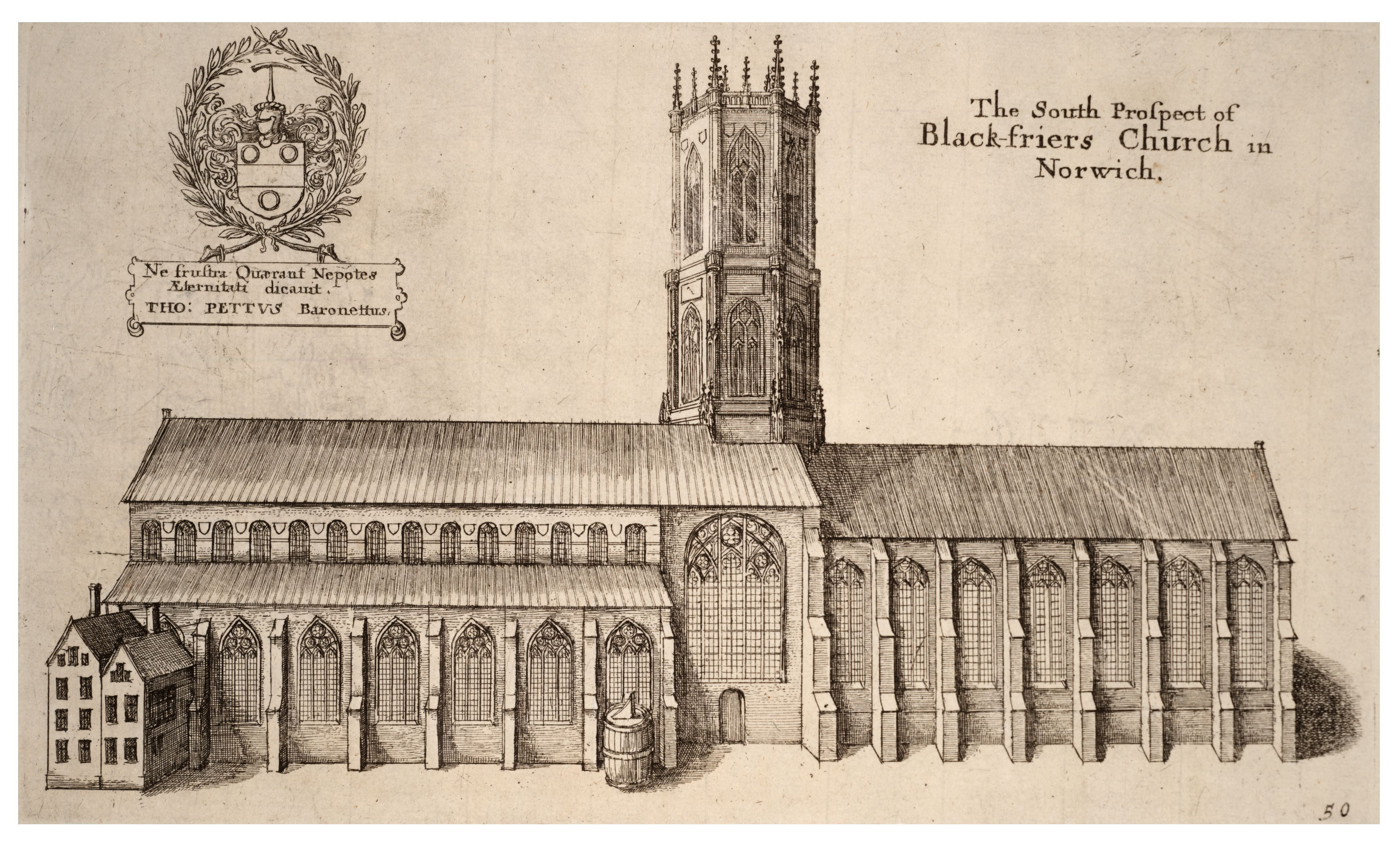
A congregation of Strangers was active in Blackfriars' Hall.

The Strangers initially experienced no restrictions on their residency under Elizabeth I, and as such were not deliberately ghettoised, integrating with their local community for the most part. They rebuilt the area north of the River Wensum that had been devastated by a large fire in 1507. Wealthy Strangers began to marry into the Norwich elite, sending their children to the local grammar school and forming business partnerships with local merchants. Dutch and French (Walloon) schools were established in the area. They funded and made use of Stranger churches, such as congregations in Blackfriars' Hall and St Mary the Less, as centres of communication and social care.

A 1568 return of Strangers made by the Bishop of Norwich recorded 1132 members of the Dutch Church in the city. Most of these new immigrants came from Flanders, though others came from Brabant and Zeeland. In 1569, a letter to the Privy Council from the Mayor and Aldermen of Norwich noted that there were 2866 Strangers in the city, of which an estimated 2000 were Dutch.

=== 1570 rebellion ===
While the majority of sentiment around the Strangers was welcoming, there was some dissent. In 1570, Norwich merchant grocer George Redman of Cringleford claimed that the Strangers were taking the jobs of Norwich's citizens, demanding that they be sent home. He threatened that if this was not done that he would "string up the Sheriff" and "levy a force." Gentlemen John Throgmorton, John Appleyard and Thomas Brooke of Rollesby supported these ideas and formed two groups. Redman mustered a number of men in Cringleford while another group was established at Harleston Fair, both with the intention to expel the strangers from the city and the realm.

Magistrates in Norwich were informed of these goings-on, and ordered the apprehension of Throgmorton and several others, ending the uprising early in its formation. These people were held at Norwich Castle and tried before Lord Chief Justice Sir Robert Catlyn, and ten were indicted for high treason, with others indicted for contempt. Appleyard and four others were found guilty of contempt; they were imprisoned and forfeited their lands and goods. Several others were condemned to death, though only three – Throgmorton, Brooke, and Redman – were found guilty of high treason. Throgmorton confessed to being the chief conspirator on the gallows after being silent during his trial. All three were hanged, drawn and quartered around August and September 1570.

Historians have argued that the 1570 rebellion was led by Catholic sympathisers who were aligned with the Northern rebellion in 1569 which had aimed to replace the Queen with the Duke of Norfolk, and that the unease against the immigrants encouraged the rebels to incite the people of Norwich to remove the Strangers. They argue that this unease was less apparent in Norwich, and that the council was less sympathetic to the Catholics, leading to the rebellion's failure.

=== Continued immigration and attempted restrictions ===
By 1571, there were as many as 3,999 Dutch and Walloon immigrants in Norwich. That year, the authorities searched Strangers' homes for armour and weaponry. In September 1574, the Mayor of Norwich warned the Dutch in the city that no more strangers would be received by the town; this was ineffective as their numbers continued to increase. It was estimated that aliens in Norwich numbered 6,000 of its total population of between 14,000 and 15,000 just prior to Norwich's plague outbreak of 1578–80, known as a "great mortality" during which 2,482 Strangers died. This high death toll may have been caused in part by the Strangers' cramped living conditions. A 1582 return indicated 4,679 Strangers were in the city, constituting a third of the city's population, and a 9 November 1583 survey counted 4,678 Strangers, of which 1,378 were children born in England to stranger families. It is estimated that there were thus around 3,500 Dutch in the city in the early 1580s. This population varied between wards, with 653 Strangers reported in Colegate ward and only 53 and 55 reported in St Gyles and Berestrete respectively. The highest geographical concentration of Strangers was in the wards of Middle and West Wymer in the city centre.

On 21 July 1584 the magistracy of the Dutch Church at Norwich published an ordinance stating that "no more foreigners" would be received in the town, and the Dutch Church at London conveyed this message to foreign churches in England and overseas the next month. An order was also issued in 1585 which commanded Henry Fond and Thomas Weavers not to bring more foreigners to Norwich, threatening their imprisonment. The late 1580s is thought to be the peak of the settlement of the Strangers in Norwich. By the end of the 16th century, the largest of the provincial immigrant communities in England was the Strangers in Norwich, with the alien community there peaking at 40% of its population around this time.

By the end of the 16th century, the industry of the city had been revived. Strangers taught English textile apprentices new techniques; the "New Draperies" produced by this became lucrative exports to Europe and the East. In 1596, poor harvests led the authorities to ask a Stranger, Jacques de Hem, for help. He enabled them to secure food provisions from Europe. By 1600, Norwich weavers faced a shortage of yarn and labour.

=== Assimilation and apparent decline in population ===
By the early 1590s, there were around 4,000 Strangers in Norwich of a total of 11,000, though this reduced to less than 3,000 by the end of the decade. From 1598, foreigners could be admitted to the freedom of the city on the same terms as natives. The children of Strangers returned to Holland to attend university, strengthening ties between the regions.

While assimilation took place and the Stranger community diminished, they remained a significant presence in Norwich in 1625, 60 years after officially arriving. A list from 1624 recorded only 999 Dutch people living in Norwich, and only 678 were recorded in a similar list from 1634. Based on a total of 759 communicants recorded at the Bulteel and Dutch Church in 1635, historian Nigel Goose estimated that that year a minimum of 1,500 and a maximum of 2,000 Strangers lived in Norwich.

=== Further restrictions under William Laud ===
By the 1630s, England had become less tolerant of the Strangers, who were largely Puritan and Calvinist. While unrelated to the Strangers, suspicions were raised by evidence of the smuggling of radical religious books into Norwich from the Low Countries, as well as the establishment of a gathered church by English Puritans in Rotterdam. Archbishop of Canterbury William Laud ordered them to attend only English services, while his follower Matthew Wren, Bishop of Norwich was known to argue with the Stranger community, accusing one congregation of Strangers of damaging the Bishop's Chapel, and fretting that the English church may be weakened by Stranger congregations. In the years before the English Civil War, it was thought that the Strangers may be disloyal to the Crown.

Over time, the immigrants integrated into the Norwich community such that they were no longer considered "strangers".

=== Canary breeding ===
Canary breeding was one tradition of the Strangers that caught on among Norwich locals. This led to a new breed of canary known as the "Norwich canary", and the nickname of Norwich City F.C., the Canaries.

== Resettlement to other smaller towns ==
Aside from the larger Stranger colonies of Norwich and London, Strangers resided in other towns such as Colchester, Sandwich and Canterbury to a lesser extent.

In Colchester, some migrants arrived decades before the rest and as such had become life-long residents of Colchester; these were dubbed "Old Strangers". A colony that had arrived in Sandwich in 1570 began in Colchester with around 50 people. A May 1571 alien survey counted 185 Strangers, of whom 55 were Old Strangers. One such Old Stranger was Dutch shoemaker Winken Greneryce; he had lived in Colchester for over 40 years as of 1571, had been admitted as a freeman and had served as a burgess on the Colchester Council. Colchester's parishes of St James, St Peter, St Nicholas and All Saints consistently had the most alien residents from 1582 to 1592. The alien community in Colchester numbered 431 by 1573, and this increased almost 300% to 1,297 people by 1586.

While there is no official estimate of the number of Strangers who came to Canterbury, Anne M. Oakley estimated that the initial settlement constituted around 750 people out of a native population of around 4,500.

== See also ==
- Strangers' Hall
- Anthonie de Solempne
