= King of Christmas =

Online Christmas tree retailer

King Of Christmas
- Company type: Private
- Industry: Christmas Store, Artificial Christmas Trees. Home Decor
- Founded: 2012
- Headquarters: Mountain Top, Pennsylvania, United States
- Products: Artificial Christmas trees, Christmas Wreaths and Garlands, Christmas Ornaments
- Website: kingofchristmas.com

King Of Christmas is a Pennsylvania-based online store which specializes in artificial Christmas trees and Christmas accessories. King of Christmas models their artificial trees after the most commonly used Christmas trees.

== History ==
The company was established in November 2012 to make artificial Christmas trees, after which it has grown out to be one of the largest online Christmas retailers.

The company has received coverage in mainstream media such as Fox News, Star-News, Good News Network, The Doctors TV Show, and CBS News, among others.
