= Cornelis Adriaensen =

Belgian priest

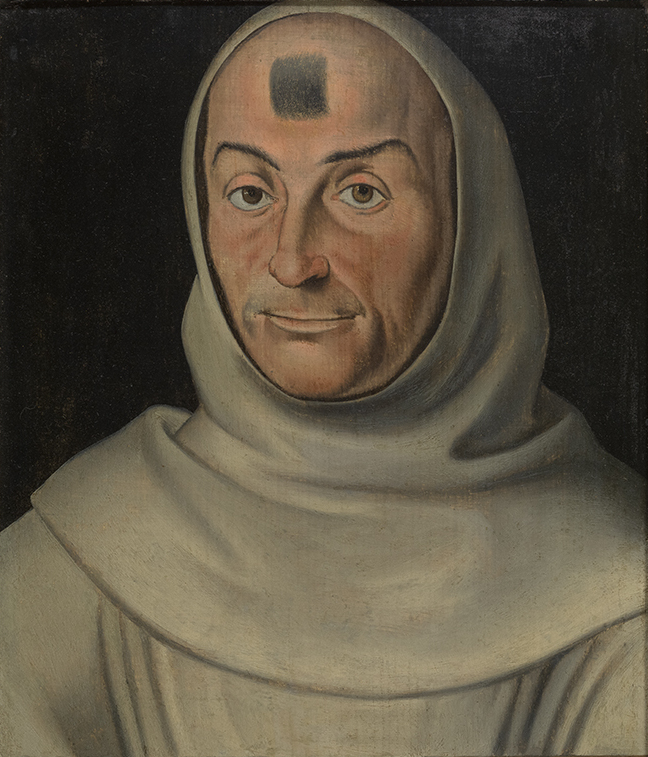
Portrait of Adriaensen, dated 1573

Cornelis Adriaensen (Dutch: Cornelis Adriaansz; also called Cornelis Brouwer; 1521–1581) was a Dutch or Flemish preacher of the Order of Saint Francis and an author, active mainly in Bruges. He is most notorious for founding and running a cultish Disciplina Gynopygica in Bruges where women and girls were encouraged to strip naked to receive light castigation.

== Life and works ==
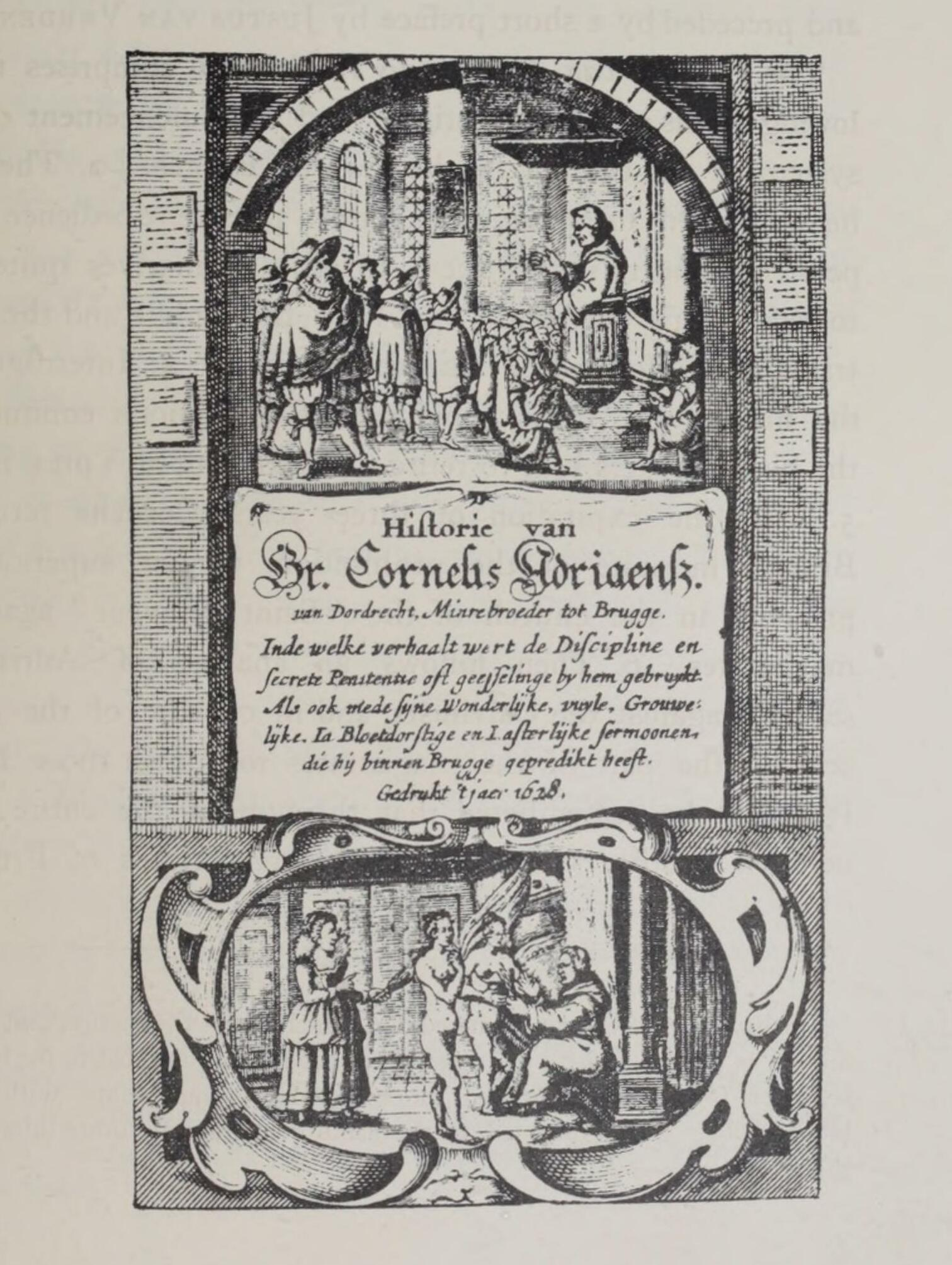
Title page of the 1628 edition of the Historie van B. Cornelis Adriaensen

He was born at Dort (Dordrecht) in 1521, and died at Ypres on 14 July 1581. He wrote sermons full of invectives against the leaders of the Huguenots in the Low Countries. There are many editions of these sermons, the first of which was published in 1569. Another at Amsterdam, in 1607 and 1640, bears a figure joined to the title which gives an idea of the character of the book. It represents the strange discipline to which Adriaensen submitted his penitents, in order to deliver them from the natural timidity which hindered them from boldly confessing to him all their thoughts, their words, their songs, and their actions, which (according to Christian thought) have their origin in the temptations peculiar to the flesh; discipline which Voet called "Disciplinam gymnopygicam Cornelianam", in his Disputationes Selectae 4:262.

=== Historie van B. Cornelis Adriaensen ===
The Historie van B. Cornelis Adriaensen comprises the following items:

1. The origin and commencement of his system of flagellation in the town of Bruges.
2. The means he employed to obtain the perfect passive obedience of his penitents, and to induce them to strip naked to receive his correction.
3. How the public and the magistrates were informed of his secret doings.
4. Interrogated by the magistrates, he is convicted of scandalous conduct, and the bishop orders him to retire to a convent at Ypres, in 1563.
5. After the expiration of three years, Cornelis returns to Bruges, in spite of the prohibition of his superiors, and preaches in the church of the "Saint Sauveur" against the magistrates.
6. Then follows an analysis of Adriaensen's sermons against the Calvinists.

== Sources ==
- Thompson, Roger (1979). Unfit For Modest Ears. Totowa, NJ: Rowman and Littlefield. p. 142.
- Wedeck, Harry E. (1962). "Adriaensen, Cornelius". Dictionary of Erotic Literature. Philosophical Library, Inc. p. 4.
