= Singer (surname) =

Singer is a surname. Notable people with the surname include:

== Business and industry ==
- Baruch Singer (born 1954), American real estate investor
- Carl Singer (1916–2008), American businessman, investor, and philanthropist
- George Singer (cycle manufacturer) (1874–1909), English cycle manufacturer
- Gordon Singer (born 1973/1974), American hedge fund manager, son of Paul
- John Webb Singer (1819–1904), English bronze founder
- Horace M. Singer (1823–1896), American businessman and politician
- Isaac Singer (1811–1875), American inventor of the modern sewing machine and founder of the Singer Corporation
- Lauren Singer, environmental activist, entrepreneur, and blogger
- Lavoslav Singer (1866–1942), Croatian industrialist
- Linda Singer (born 1966), American attorney
- Malcolm Singer (born 1953), English composer and educationalist
- Paul Singer (businessman) (born 1944) American billionaire, founder of Elliott Management
- William Rick Singer, American consultant who pleaded guilty to bribing college admission officials

== Arts and entertainment ==
- Abby Singer (1917–2014), American production manager and assistant director
- Alexander Singer (1928–2020), American director
- Andy Singer (born 1965), American political cartoonist
- Angela Singer (born 1966), artist
- Arthur B. Singer (1917–1990), American wildlife artist
- Artie Singer (1919–2008), American songwriter, music producer and bandleader
- Aubrey Singer (1927–2007), CBE British broadcasting executive
- Benno Singer (1875–1934), Hungarian-born British entertainment administrator
- Bob Singer (born 1928), American artist and character designer
- Bobbie Singer (born 1981), Austrian singer
- Brooke Singer (born 1972), New York City–based media artist
- Bryan Singer (born 1965), American film director, nephew of Jacques Singer, cousin of Lori and Marc Singer
- Burr Singer (1912–1992), American artist
- Campbell Singer (1909–1976), British character actor
- Donna Singer (born 1965), American jazz vocalist
- Dulcy Singer, American television producer
- Eric Singer (born 1958), American rock drummer
- Eric Warren Singer, American screenwriter
- Hal Singer (1919–2020), American R&B and jazz bandleader and saxophonist
- Henry Singer (born 1957), documentary filmmaker
- Jacques Singer (1910–1980), Polish-born American violinist, orchestra conductor, father of Lori and Marc Singer
- Jeanne Singer (1924–2000), American pianist, teacher, and composer of lyrical poetry
- Jeff Singer (born 1971), British musician and drummer
- Jill Singer (1957–2017), Australian journalist, writer, and television presenter
- Jonathan M. Singer, podiatrist and photographer
- Josh Singer (born 1972), American film/television writer and producer
- Leah Singer, photographer and multimedia artist
- Leo Singer (1877–1951), vaudeville manager
- Loren Singer (1923–2009), American novelist
- Lori Singer (born 1957), American actress, daughter of Jacques Singer, sister of Marc Singer
- Marc Singer (born 1948), American TV actor, son of Jacques Singer, brother of Lori Singer
- Michael Singer (artist) (1945–2024), American sculptor and designer
- Michele Singer (1957–2025), American filmmaker and photographer
- Mike Singer (born 2000), German pop singer
- Simon Singer (born 1941), American world champion American handball player, and radio and television actor
- Uri Singer, Israeli businessman and film producer

=== Poets and authors ===
- Burns Singer (1928–1964), American poet
- Christiane Singer (1943–2007), French writer, essayist, and novelist
- Florantonia Singer, Venezuelan journalist
- Isaac Bashevis Singer (1902–1991), Polish-born American novelist and younger brother of Israel Joshua Singer
- Israel Joshua Singer (1893–1944), Polish-born American novelist and elder brother of Isaac Bashevis Singer
- Margot Singer, American writer
- Michael Alan Singer (born 1947), American author, journalist, and motivational speaker

=== Characters ===
- Addie Singer, fictional character from the TV show Unfabulous
- Alvy Singer, lead character played by Woody Allen in the movie Annie Hall

== Scientists, educators, scholars ==
- Amy Singer, Ottoman historian
- André Vítor Singer (born 1958), political sciences professor
- Burton H. Singer (1938–2026, American professor of statistics
- C. Gregg Singer (1910–1999), American historian and theologian
- Charles Singer (1876–1960), British historian
- Dorothea Waley Singer (1882–1964), historian of science
- E. C. Singer, American engineer
- Edgar Arthur Singer (1873–1954), American philosopher
- Eleanor Singer (1930–2017), Austrian-born American expert on survey methodology
- Ernestine H. Wieder Singer (1911-1938), American anthropologist and archaeologist
- Fred Singer (1924–2020), Austrian-born American physicist and professor
- George Singer (1786–1817), English early pioneer of electrical research
- Hans Singer (1910–2006), German economist
- Ignatius Singer (c. 1853–1926), British writer and social reformer
- Irving Singer (1925–2015), American professor of philosophy
- Isadore Singer (1924–2021), American mathematician
- Isidore Singer (1859–1939), editor of the Jewish Encyclopedia
- Itamar Singer (1946–2012), Israeli archaeologist
- J. David Singer (1925–2009), American professor of political science
- Josef Singer (1923–2009), Israeli President of Technion – Israel Institute of Technology
- Joseph W. Singer, American legal theorist
- Judith D. Singer, American academic, statistician, and social scientist
- June Singer (1920–2004), American analytical psychologist
- Kurt Singer (1886–1962), German economist and philosopher
- Marcus George Singer (1926–2016), American philosopher
- Michael F. Singer (born 1950), American mathematician
- P. W. Singer, (né Peter Warren Singer, born 1973/74), American scholar of politics and war
- Peter Singer (born 1946), Australian philosopher concerned with treatment of animals and other ethical topics
- Rolf Singer (1906–1994), German-born mycologist
- Samuel Weller Singer (1783–1858), English author, Shakespeare scholar and historian of card games
- Seymour Jonathan Singer (1924–2017), American cell biologist and university professor
- Stephen Singer-Brewster (born 1945), American astronomer
- Tanja Singer (born 1969), German neuroscientist
- Wolf Singer (born 1943), German neurophysiologist

== Applied medicine and clinical psychology ==
- Alfred Singer (born 1946), American immunologist
- Amy Singer (born 1953), Florida trial consultant and research psychologist
- Donald Singer (1954–2022), British clinical pharmacologist
- Jerome E. Singer (1934–2010), American social psychologist
- Jerome L. Singer (1924–2019), American psychology professor
- Margaret Singer (1921–2003), American clinical psychologist
- Peter A. Singer (born 1960), Canadian physician and bioethicist

== Public service ==
- Arlene Singer (born 1948), judge
- Cecile D. Singer (born 1929), New York politician
- Christine Singer, German politician
- Gary Singer, Australian politician
- Israel Singer (born 1942), secretary general of the World Jewish Congress
- Jack Singer (1917–2013), Canadian real estate developer, financier, and philanthropist
- Joseph Singer (politician) (1890–1967), Toronto city councillor and lawyer
- Leonard Singer (born 1943), British politician and pharmacist
- Paul Singer (1844–1911), German politician
- Peter Singer (judge) (1944–2018), judge of the High Court of England and Wales
- Ulrich Singer (born 1976), German politician
- Vlado Singer (1908–1943), Croatian politician
- William Singer, Chicago alderman

== Sports ==
- Al Singer (1909–1961), American boxer
- Andreas Singer (born 1946), Slovak football manager and former player
- Bill Singer (born 1944), American former professional baseball pitcher
- Brady Singer (born 1996), American baseball pitcher
- Chantal Singer, Canadian water skier
- Christina Singer (born 1968), German tennis player
- Dorian Singer (born 2002), American football player
- Heike Singer (born 1964), East German sprint canoer
- Jimmy Singer (1937–2010), Welsh professional footballer
- Joachim Singer (born 1942), German hurdler
- Karin Singer (born 1966), former synchronized swimmer
- Karl Singer (born 1943), American football player
- Kyle Singer (born 1980), American soccer player
- Rory Singer (born 1976), American mixed martial artist
- Sam Singer (born 1995), American-Israeli basketball player for Israeli team Bnei Herzliya
- Simon Singer (born 1941), American world champion American handball player, and radio and television actor
- Walt Singer (1911–1992), American football player

== Other uses ==
- Holm Singer (born 1961), former East German Stasi informant
- Winnaretta Singer (1865–1943), princess and daughter of Isaac Merrit Singer

== Other disambiguations ==
- Alex Singer (disambiguation)
- André Singer (disambiguation)
- Daniel Singer (disambiguation)
- David Singer (disambiguation)
- I. M. Singer (disambiguation)
- James Singer (disambiguation)
- Jerome Singer (disambiguation)
- John Singer (disambiguation)
- Jonathan Singer (disambiguation)
- Peter Singer (disambiguation)

== See also ==
- Singer (disambiguation)
- Sanger (surname)
- Chief Singer
- Singer Usha (born 1979)
