= Sanger (surname) =

Sanger is a surname. Notable people with the surname include:

- Alexander C. Sanger (born 1947), American reproductive rights activist
- Andrew Sanger (born 1948), British travel writer
- Carol Sanger (born 1948), American reproductive rights legal scholar
- Casper Sanger (1836–1897), American politician
- Clyde Sanger (1928–2022), English journalist, first Africa correspondent for The Guardian newspaper
- David Sanger (organist) (1947–2010), English organist
- David Sanger (drummer), American drummer
- David E. Sanger (born 1960), American journalist, with The New York Times
- Eleanor Sanger (1929–1993), American Television Sports Producer
- Elliott Sanger (1897–1989), American radio station founder
- Esther R. Sanger (1926–1995), American humanitarian
- Frederick Sanger (1918-2013), English biochemist
- Lord George Sanger, (1825-1911), English circus proprietor
- George Sanger (musician), American video game music composer
- Jedediah Sanger (1751-1829), American politician and businessman
- John Sanger (1816–1889), English circus proprietor
- Larry Sanger (born 1968), co-founder of Wikipedia and founder of Citizendium
- Margaret Sanger (1879–1966), American birth control activist
- Percival Sanger (1899—1968), English cricketer and an officer in both the British Army and the British Indian Army
- Peter Sanger (born 1943), Canadian poet and prose writer
- Ruth Sanger (1918–2001), Australian haematologist and serologist
- Stephen Sanger (born 1946), American businessman, chairman and CEO of General Mills
- William Sanger (1885–1975), American doctor, past president of the Medical College of Virginia

== See also ==
- Sanger
- Saenger (disambiguation), which includes people with the surname Sänger or Saenger
- Senger
- Singer (surname)
- Singermann
