= Singe (disambiguation) =

Singe is a slight scorching, burn or treatment with flame.

Singe may also refer to:

- French ship Singe, several vessels of the French Navy
- Singe (surname), includes a list of notable people with this surname
- Singe (Tanzanian ward), an administrative ward in Tanzania

== See also ==
- Singer (disambiguation)
