= William N. Valavanis =

Bonsai artist

- Born: William Nicholas Valavanis; 3 September 1951 (age 73); Waukegan, Illinois

William N. Valavanis (born September 3, 1951), is a Greek-American bonsai master who carries on Yuji Yoshimura's tradition of teaching Japanese techniques and aesthetics to enthusiasts in the West.

== Early life and beginnings in bonsai ==
Valavanis was born in Waukegan, Illinois. At age 11, he began to pot tree seedlings and bend them into bonsai shapes. Four years later in the family's new home in Charleston, West Virginia, he began to exhibit and lecture on bonsai at local garden clubs, and the following year started the "House of Bonsai" business. The family moved to Rochester, New York in 1968. The summer of 1970 Valavanis spent studying with Kyuzo Murata at that master's Kyuka-en Bonsai Garden in Japan's Omiya Bonsai Village, and with Toshio Kawamoto at the Nippon Bonsai-Saikei Institute in Tokyo. The following year Valavanis graduated from The State University of New York Agricultural and Technical College at Farmingdale, Long Island, NY with a degree in Ornamental Horticulture. The next year he was back to Japan to study bonsai with Kakutaro Komuro and Toshio Kawamoto, bonsai chrysanthemums with Tameji Nakajima, and earn a master's teaching certificate in ikebana from the Shofu School.

Returning to his home in Rochester, NY, Valavanis had to redevelop the bonsai collection which he mostly had sold to finance his study in Japan. A degree in Floriculture and Ornamental Horticulture from Cornell University followed in 1976 on the heels of several months study at Yuji Yoshimura's School of Bonsai in Briarcliff Manor, New York. During his school days Valavanis continued to teach, train and sell bonsai; at Briarcliff Manor he conducted introductory and intermediate level bonsai courses. In 1975 and 1976 he wrote the first two volumes of the Encyclopedia of Classical Bonsai Art.

== As a bonsai educator and artist ==
Bonsai societies

Returning from another trip to Japan in 1978, the business' name was changed to "The International Bonsai Arboretum." By this time he had been an active member in and director of the influential Bonsai Society of Greater New York for several years. He now did a one-year stint as editor of that group's The Bonsai Bulletin. In the spring of 1979 Valavanis began publishing the quarterly International Bonsai magazine to further teach and disseminate classical bonsai art. A number of the articles are translated from the best Japanese bonsai magazines, allowing the world's first and longest-running independent English-language bonsai periodical to remain relevant and educational. Its circulation (in 2004) would be approximately 5,000. It would end its run in December 2020 with its 164th issue. Valavanis would briefly continue the format on-line before focusing on issues of his detailed blog with many color photographs.

Workshops and teaching

Beginning in 1981 and running through 2011 Valavanis hosted a two- to four-day long annual seminar/workshop in September on a given type or style of tree. One hundred and fifty to two hundred participants each year would attend and be taught by a local, national and international faculty. He would continue to teach and promote classical bonsai art, furthering the work of his teacher. His connections with many Japanese bonsai figures would allow him ongoing access to the history and development of the art. He has authored many articles which have been printed in English, Japanese, and European publications. Valavanis has made TV appearances in North America, Japan, Korea, Italy, and Australia as part of his well-prepared workshop and lecture presentations.

Exhibitions and travel

In June 2008 he organized the first biennial U.S. National Bonsai Exhibition. (The second and third exhibitions would also be held in June, 2010 and 2012, respectively, and then these would subsequently be moved to September: the fourth exhibition in 2014, the fifth in 2016, the sixth in 2018, the seventh in 2021 (postponed from the previous year due to the COVID-19 pandemic), the eighth in 2023, and the ninth is scheduled for 2025. Each would have a commemorative album issued afterwards.) The September 2011 issue of Japan's premier bonsai magazine Kinbon stated that 'This is the highest level bonsai exhibition in America.' Each new show exceeds past shows in both scope and quality of trees exhibited. This latest show had the exhibition area and room for 30 vendors occupying the equivalent of two football fields, 55,000 square feet of space. Subsequent exhibitions would be put together with the help of an army of volunteers from all over the U.S. and Canada, and present 200 to sometimes over 300 trees from over 120 species and cultivars coming from up to 37 states and Canada. Artists from around the world are invited to conduct demonstrations and workshops. Valavanis would go on to do increasing numbers of demonstrations nationally and internationally. Except for 2009 and 2010 (for health reasons), this widely respected teacher has made over 50 trips to Japan, including leading annual group tours to Japanese bonsai sites and in early February to the Kokufu Bonsai Ten exhibition in Tokyo, the world's premier display of bonsai.

== Awards ==
In October 2017, Valavanis became the third inductee into the National Bonsai & Penjing Museum's Bonsai Hall of Fame.

== Publications ==
In 2012 he authored the large format book Fine Bonsai: Art & Nature (NY: Abbeville Press, ISBN 978-0789211125), which has 596 digital color photos (including 4 gate folds) by Jonathan M. Singer. In 2013 his collection of case studies of 100 bonsai, Classical Bonsai Art: A Half Century of Bonsai Study: The Creations & Passion of William N. Valavanis, was published.
