= Yuji Yoshimura =

Yuji Yoshimura (February 27, 1921 Tokyo, Japan – December 24, 1997 Boston, Massachusetts) was a second-generation distinguished bonsai master who taught traditional Japanese techniques and aesthetics to enthusiasts in the West.

== Early life and career ==
Yoshimura was the second son born to the family of Toshiji Yoshimura. Toshiji (1891-1975) was a leader in the bonsai world and one of the top suiseki (viewing stone) authorities in Japan. He was also a co-founder of the Nippon Bonsai Society. Toshiji's father had been a samurai and a renowned garden designer.

In April 1952, the 31-year-old Yoshimura, assisted by German agricultural diplomat Alfred Koehn, began the first bonsai course for foreigners in Tokyo at his Kofu-en nursery. Yoshimura refused to believe the prevailing wisdom that Westerners could not understand, appreciate, or technically master bonsai. The class was an instant success, and within three years over 600 students—mostly foreign dignitaries, military personnel and businessmen and their wives—took the six-lesson course in classical bonsai art.

For the class, Yoshimura grouped the various stylings of bonsai trees into five primary categories. He also systematized much information that previously had only been passed down orally and by example from teacher to student. With the assistance of Giovanna M. Halford, a student of his from England, Yoshimura worked on a companion text. Empirical information about hundreds of types of plants used for the compositions was also compiled into a detailed database at the end of the book. In 1957, The Japanese Art of Miniature Trees and Landscapes was published by Charles E. Tuttle Co. of Rutland, Vermont and Tokyo. Although there had been a few earlier Bonsai books in English by this time, this was the first comprehensive and practical work on the subject. It was received with excitement by those who were eager to learn classical bonsai as refined during the first half of the twentieth century. The book later came to be referred to as the "Bonsai Bible in English". It would go through 37 printings before being reissued in 1996 as The Art of Bonsai: Creation, Care and Enjoyment.

Yoshimura was invited in 1958 to the Brooklyn Botanic Garden by its director George Avery. Yoshimura came to the United States with over one ton of teaching and demonstrating material, and six weeks later he gave his first course at the Brooklyn Botanic Garden, entitled "Bonsai Study & Practice". This very successful course was one of many which Yoshimura taught on many levels during the spring and autumn of that year while on the C. Stuart Gager fellowship grant. Yoshimura extended his teaching and lecturing to the West Coast and Hawaii, later returning to teach at Longwood Garden near Philadelphia.

In 1962 Yoshimura spent two months in Australia, where he made a lasting impression. Bonsai was still in its infancy in Australia, and he assisted the early teachers and students, and became the patron of a bonsai group.

At the beginning of 1963, Yoshimura and several of his students founded the Bonsai Society of Greater New York. Within three years there were 555 members, including 339 corresponding members in thirty-one states and several foreign countries.

== Later career and influence ==
During 1972, Yoshimura delivered a lecture in which he spoke of the "dream of American bonsaists for a place where they could give or will their treasures, knowing that the trees would be cared for and viewed by visitors for years to come." Newly appointed Director of the U.S. National Arboretum Dr. John L. Creech was in attendance. Creech had been a frequent visitor to Yoshimura's Tokyo garden in the early 1950s and was actually the one who had recommended the bonsai authority to Dr. Avery of the BBG.

Impressed by his old friend's thoughts and the fledgling Potomac Bonsai Association's first show at the National Arboretum, Dr. Creech then approached his departmental heads with the suggestion that acquiring a major bonsai collection might play a role in the Department of Agriculture's bicentennial plans. Receiving encouragement, Dr. Creech sought the help of longtime friends in the world of Japanese horticulture. The result was a bicentennial gift to the U.S. from persons and organizations in Japan of fifty-three bonsai and six suiseki (viewing stones) which became the initial collection in the National Bonsai and Penjing Museum.

His convention and club lectures, workshops, demonstrations, and articles in Western and Japanese specialty magazines spread Yoshimura's philosophy. His most important American student was William N. Valavanis. Yoshimura assisted his student, who became a well-respected teacher in his own right, in launching the premier issue in the Spring of 1979 of the quarterly International Bonsai. The elder sensei also translated its first article -- "Creation of Small Size Satsuki Azalea Bonsai"—from the Japanese magazine source. Valavanis' independent magazine continues to be published to this day.

In 1982 Yoshimura conducted a teaching tour for the bonsai clubs in India. Also that year the National Bonsai Foundation, Inc., a non-profit corporation in Washington, D.C., was formed on behalf of the National Bonsai and Penjing Museum of the National Arboretum. John Naka, Yuji Yoshimura, and now former Arboretum Director Dr. John L. Creech were elected as advisors to the Foundation.

In 1984 The Japanese Art of Stone Appreciation, Suiseki and Its Use with Bonsai was published by Charles E. Tuttle Co. The authors were Vincent T. Covello and Yuji Yoshimura. This would also become a go-to reference work on the subject.

The John Y. Naka Pavilion was dedicated in October 1990 to house the National Collection of North American Bonsai. Connected to the Naka Pavilion is the Yoshimura Center housing a lecture and workshop room. Two of Yoshimura's bonsai are in the National Collection.

The National Bonsai Foundation, Inc. established the Yuji Yoshimura Fund as a permanent endowment to keep this great artist's spirit alive for future generations.

Having lived in the Western world for over thirty-five years, Yoshimura had personally observed the differences in the Eastern and Western cultures as reflected by their arts. Although his students had been primarily of the United States, he taught classical bonsai to thousands of students worldwide. In that Yuji Yoshimura was a Japanese bonsai artist who lived outside Japan for such a long span of years, he became a direct link between Japanese classical bonsai traditions and the progressive Western approach. The result was an elegant and refined school of bonsai adapted for the modern world. Yoshimura encouraged the use of native plants and local stylings by enthusiasts around the globe practicing this now widespread art.

In 2015, Yoshimura became the second inductee into the National Bonsai & Penjing Museum's Bonsai Hall of Fame.

From October 12 thru November 24, 2019, the Omiya Bonsai Museum in Saitama, Japan, in cooperation with its sister institution the U.S. National Bonsai & Penjing Museum, hosted an exhibition recognizing the contributions Yoshimura had made to expand the Japanese art of bonsai across the ocean.

== Works cited ==
- Dannett, Emanuel (1983). "The National Bonsai Foundation". Bonsai Magazine. 22 (3).
- Dillon, Jim (1972). "Sokumenzu -- Profile of Yoshimura". Bonsai Magazine. 11 (6).
- Golden Statements (September/October 1994)
- "How It All Began". Bonsai Magazine. 35 (4). 1996.
- Smith, Jean C. (1983). "I.B.C. '83 Bonsai Horizon Headliners". Bonsai Magazine. 22 (5).
- Valavanis, William N. (1998). "Profile of an Artist". Bonsai Journal. 32 (1).
- Valavanis, William N. (1998). "Yuji Yoshimura, A Memorial Tribute To A Bonsai Master & Pioneer". International Bonsai. 20 (1).
