= Joel Wiener =

American real estate developer and landlord

- Born: 1948 or 1949 (age 76–77); Brooklyn, New York, U.S.
- Education: Brooklyn Law School (JD)
- Occupation: Businessman
- Known for: Landlord with 10,000+ apartments in New York City
- Title: CEO, Pinnacle Group

Joel Saul Wiener (born 1948/1949) is an American real estate developer and landlord, and the CEO of Pinnacle Group.

== Early life ==
Joel Saul Wiener was born in Brooklyn, the son of Paul Wiener. His brother Arthur Wiener is also a landlord.

Wiener earned a J.D. degree from Brooklyn Law School in 1974.

== Career ==
The family firm, Arthur Holding Company, purchased New York buildings in the 1970s and 1980s. Wiener himself started buying building from the late 1980s onwards. He founded Wiener Realty in 1995. Through his company, Pinnacle Group, Wiener manages about $2 billion worth of New York City property, 10,000 apartments, almost all rent-regulated, in every borough except Staten Island.

Pinnacle has had extensive funding from the Praedium REIT, including the purchase of Baruch Singer's nearly 3,000 apartments in northern Manhattan for $500 million.

As of 2006, Wiener had been personally sued 84 times. His company has been the "subject of criminal investigations by the Manhattan district attorney and the state attorney general's office; it has been denounced by Representative Charles B. Rangel and other politicians". Wiener "has a reputation for being ruthless among many tenants".

In 2017, Bloomberg News determined that he had reached a net worth of $1.0 billion.

In October 2022, it was disclosed that the State of New York obtained a settlement with Wiener, where the CEO admitted to state Attorney General Letitia James’s office that Wiener's company had failed to properly acknowledge the capital repairs necessary for gas piping when selling units in the converted Forest Hills condo. This was not the first time that the Pinnacle Group has come under legal scrutiny. Over the course of a 2006 investigation, the company — which owned 20,000 apartments in New York City at the time — conceded that it had overcharged rent-stabilized tenants at an apartment complex in The Bronx. Pinnacle agreed to pay $1 million to 300 tenants to make up for what they’d been overcharged, with interest. The company also agreed to “retain a forensic accounting firm to review rents charged on all of its properties in New York City.”

== Personal life ==
Wiener is married, with a daughter, and lives in Woodmere, Long Island, New York.
