= Norwich Affray =

1583 street fight and murder in Norwich, England

The Norwich Affray, or Red Lion affray, was a street affray and murder that occurred in the city of Norwich, England on the afternoon of Saturday 15 June 1583. An unknown play by Queen Elizabeth's Men (or Queen's Men) at the local Red Lion Inn was interrupted when a man named Winsdon attempted to enter the inn's gates to see the performance without a ticket. John Bentley, Richard Tarlton, and John Singer, who were members of the Queen's Men, stopped their performance to deal with Winsdon and this became a physical fight. Bentley and Singer pursued the two down Rampant Horse Lane (now Orford Place) with the real swords they were using for the performance. Though Winsdon was able to escape, his alleged servant known only as George was struck by Singer as well as Henry Brown, an audience member and servant of Sir William Paston. Brown was generally believed to have dealt the killing blow, murdering George.

After depositions were taken, and George was buried in the local parish, Bentley, Singer, and Brown were imprisoned, though the former two were released after two days and later did not appear for their trial. Brown plead guilty and was granted benefit of clergy on 23 September 1583, avoiding a possible execution.

The incident may have led to more rigorous recording of players' performances in the city, as well as increasing restrictions upon them. There is debate among historians concerning the motives of those involved and the identification of the play that was being performed on the night; it may have been The Famous Victories of Henry V, or a lost play.

== Background ==
In the decade leading up to the 1583 affray, Norwich had been host to plays about twice yearly by twelve different acting companies. Earlier in 1583, the Norwich Corporation had ordered another playing troupe known as the Earl of Worcester's Men not to perform in Norwich; it was recounted that the Corporation "dyd gyve them [...] xxvjs viijd wherevppon they promysed to depart & not to play". The Earl's Men initially defied the order anyway, but after the Corporation threatened that the Earl of Worcester "shalbee certyfyed of their contempt", they apologised. There were also two processions in 1583 Norwich prior to the performance; the celebration of Guild Day on 23 April – the procession head being known to carry a gilded wooden sword – and the subsequent mayoral inauguration in late June.

The Red Lion Inn at the time was a good property in a good neighbourhood, part of a then-thriving hospitality industry in Norwich. Located in the parish of St Stephen's, there were four other inns close by. It was, the second tenement north of Nedham Sloughe, now St Stephen's Street, on the east side of Wasselgate, which would later become Red Lion Lane and now Red Lion Street. The inn was likely under ownership of William Buttfeild, a former constable of Norwich in 1544 and councillor from 1558 to 1560 as well as in 1563. His yearly rent from 1568 to 1626 was one penny, a substantial amount compared to other inns in the area. Robert Davy, whose house gate on the corner of Rampant Horse Lane (now Orford Place) would be one backdrop to the affray's resultant murder, was a grocer, the city coroner, a long term parish resident, and likely the son of former Mayor of Norwich Richard Davy. Robert had a wife, Elizabeth. Stephyn Atkyns's gate was also on Rampant Horse Lane; he was a gentleman also with a long record of public service.

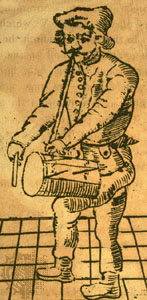
Richard Tarleton, a member of the Queen's Men, was performing on the night and engaged with the initial incident at the Red Lion gate

The Queen's Men were a dramatic troupe made up of twelve actors hand-picked by the Earl of Leicester and the Master of the Revels of Queen Elizabeth I, Edmund Tilney, in 1583. That summer the group began their first provincial tour, which included visits to Nottingham and Ipswich, and then the city of Norwich, at that time the second largest city in England and a frequent 'stopping-place' for touring players. The Queen's Men as a group were only a month old at the time. They included actor John Bentley, clown Richard Tarlton, and John Singer (Syngar). The three were adept at fencing and improvisation.

=== Red Lion Inn performance ===
The Norwich Corporation gave the Queen's Men 40 shillings to perform at the local Red Lion Inn on Red Lion Street, later known as the Cricketer's Arms, on 15 June 1583, a Saturday afternoon, likely between 12pm and 1pm. The performance was held on a stage in the inn's yard; this stage was either owned by the Queen's Men or was an improvised platform made of barrels or barrel forms, similar to those in the Norwich Guildhall and New Hall. Siobhan Keenan has speculated that the stage was low enough to jump from, possibly two or three feet in height, and may have been located in the middle of the yard or parallel with the side of the inn facing the gate such that those on stage would be able to see the goings-on at the entrance. She argues that the audience was likely stood around the stage on three sides with a tiring area on the fourth side; there are no references in contemporary documents to them being seated or seats being in the yard. Spectators were expected to pay the gatekeeper to see the performance.

The size of the audience is not recorded, though all audience eyewitnesses were men, indicating that women were fewer in number. Based on depositions from spectators, the audience included gentlemen such as Thomas Osborne, yeomen such as Edmund Knee, a number of different tradesmen and craftsmen such as draper Edmund Brown and worsted weaver William Kilby (Kylby), and gentlemen's servants. Kara Northway has said the witnesses were "almost entirely craftsmen, those who may well have participated in planning and performing in Norwich processions and who would have taken an active part in government". They included local men such as Thomas Holland and Edmund Brown, as well as Kilby who was from Pockthorpe, and others from other areas; Osborne was from 'Kyrbye Bydon' and Knee was from Yelverton.

Those present at the performance who would be directly involved in the incident included three Queen's Men members; Bentley, Tarlton, and Singer, the latter of whom was either performing on stage or the inn's gatekeeper for the night. Jennifer Roberts-Smith has speculated that the money that had been earned at the gate, in the possession of Singer, may have been very substantial by the time of the incident. Bentley in particular was the company's leading tragedian and may have been accustomed to grand and heroic gestures. In the audience was one Henry Brown, servant of the gentleman Sir William Paston. Winsdon, who would try to enter the inn, had a man with him, only known as 'George', who is generally understood to have been Winsdon's servant. George is also identified in depositions as "a man in a blew cote".

== Incident ==
All evidence of what took place at the Red Lion is indirect. During the performance, a local man Winsdon attempted to gain entry to the gate of the Red Lion without paying first; it was reported that he "would have intred at the gate but woold not haue payed vntyll he had been within". The gatekeeper, possibly John Singer, refused Winsdon entry to the inn, provoking an argument. Winsdon knocked the money out of the keeper's hand in an attempt to force his way in. Singer went to the gate if he was not already there. The audience and players inside the inn became aware of the disturbance, and spectator Henry Brown went to the gate alongside Tarleton and Bentley, the latter of whom had definitely been on stage at the time, with a rapier. Eyewitness accounts differ on whether they had their swords drawn or were holding them in their scabbards when exiting the stage. The audience began to move with them. Tarlton made an attempt to eject Winsdon from the inn yard, and Bentley hit Winsdon on the head with the hilt of the sword he had been using as a prop in the play. (Note: Kara Northway has stated instead that Tarleton struck Wynsdon at the gate. However, Jennifer Roberts-Smith and Siobhan Keenan have stated that Bentley did so. The 1583 depositions state that: "Tarleton came out of the stayge and would haue thrust hym out at the gate but in the meane tyme one Bentley he wich played the duke came of the Stage and wyth his hiltes of his Sworde he Strooke wynsdon vpon the heade and offered hym an other Strype but Tarleton defended yt".)

Winsdon fled the gate into the street, and joined his servant George who was standing nearby. Tarleton then surrendered the fight and went about restraining Bentley, who was still holding his rapier. One deponent recalled that Bentley convincingly feigned a willingness to end the chase before instead pursuing the pair. Bentley pursued both Winsdon and George, and were joined in the chase by Brown. They were trailed by at least six audience members, following the action on a similar path to that of Queen Elizabeth's first pageant for her 1578 royal entry to Norwich, with the frequently stated intention to watch rather than to aid any party in the fighting. The fight moved west up Rampant Horse Lane, now Orford Place.

Winsdon outran the group, leaving the three to chase George only. Bentley "overtooke" George; "at the cockey nere Mr Davyes howse", Bentley thrust his sword into George's leg. George was reported as crying "oh you haue mayned me". George then paused to throw stones at Bentley's head; this was corroborated by four witnesses and it was written that these stones "brocke his heade". Brown's own deposition records himself calling George a "villan" and asking of George, "wilt thowe murder the quene's man?" George called Brown a "villan" in return. Brown pursued George further.

At "Bloomes backgate betwne the red lyon & mr davyes howse," also referred to by Brown as "the whyte horse gate in St Stephans", Brown despite protests from spectators "drew backe hys Sworde", and struck George. It was later believed that this was the blow that killed George; one spectator later said that "he never sawe man bleed so muche as hee dyd after mr Pastons man had pricked hym". George ran "vntyll he came almoste at mr Davyes corner". While this was taking place, Singer, the gatekeeper, also obtained a sword from the stage, a large two-handed "Armynge Sworde", and joined the pursuit. Singer drew his sword as he exited the gate of the Red Lion, caught up with George at Mr Davy's corner, and struck him on the shoulder. After seeing this strike, playgoer Edmund Brown berated Singer by saying "you ha[ve] done ill to cut the man". Spectator Edmund Kerry attempted to hold one of the players, though said one of them "ran at hym with his sworde", causing Kerry to flee.

Brown recognised George's condition and called for the others to "'give hym noe more for he dowted he had ynoughe already". Immediately following the end of the fight, Singer cheered for Brown, promising his friendship; "howe shalt haue what ffrendshipe we can procure thee". Elizabeth, the wife of Robert Davy, became aware of George's condition as he laid outside their house's gate; "for pyttye sake shee tooke into comforte hym". Similarly, one Margery Bloome (Margerye), wife of Thomas Bloome, found him "at mr Atkyns backgate" and "went to hym and stopped his wounde". Prior to his death, George stated that an individual with a red coat had hurt him; Brown was wearing a "tawnye cote". George later died of his wounds.

== Aftermath ==
There is no indication that the play resumed after the fight.

=== Investigation, imprisonment of perpetrators, and burial of George ===
During the judicial investigation into the incident, on 17 June, several depositions were collected, from which most historical evidence of the event now derives. These depositions are noted in the record as taking place "vppon the vew of the dead bodye". They were taken by Robert Davy in his capacity as coroner, as well as Simon Bowde who was quarter sessions justice, former mayor and owner of some of the inns next door to the Red Lion. There survives thirteen depositions today, two of which being hearsay. Six of the people questioned were attendees of the play, all six of whom had followed the actors out of the Red Lion. Those who were not inside the inn yard when the incident began were Norwich carrier Thomas Holland, Norwich brewer George Jackson, and Margery Blooome and Elizabeth Jackson who had tended to George in the street.

While no witness perceived all of the events, the depositions overlap; five of the thirteen saw both George and Winsdon, five saw Bentley's attacks, five saw Singer's attacks, and six saw Brown's attacks. Justices attempted to determine the affray's cause, the order and locations of events, the number of victims and assailants, and the identity of the violent perpetrators with a focus on who delivered the blow that had killed George. Other questions attempted to confirm how many players had left the stage, and "whether they were in there play or noe". Statements were not taken from the players.

Bowde committed Brown, Singer and Bentley to prison on 17 June, though Singer and Bentley were released on bail two days later on 19 June 1583, following negotiation for Bentley's release by Thomas Bloome who was a mercer as well as a former constable, chamberlain and foreign receiver. Bentley was bound "to the lady queen [...] for £20 [...] on the following condition, viz: that [...] the same John will appear in person before the justices of the said lady queen at the next general sessions of the peace". Brown awaited trial in prison.

George was buried in the local parish; the final record of his life lists him as "one George, slayne".

Bentley and Singer's bonds were renewed on 1 July 1583, and from this point they along with Tarlton were allowed to become guarantors for each other, whereas Brown retained his original guarantors who were two other citizens in Norwich and still owed the original bail money amount.

=== Trial of Brown ===
Singer's promised friendship with Brown either did not form or was of little value; on 23 September 1583, Singer and Bentley did not make themselves present for court, and Brown faced charges of felony and homicide. He confessed his guilt, and was granted benefit of clergy which allowed him to avoid execution; he was "dischardged". There is no evidence that Singer and Bentley were reprimanded by Norwich justices for not answering their charges, and no evidence of the Crown interfering in the case.

=== Long-term aftermath ===
By November 1583, the Queen's Men were licensed to perform at the Bull and Bell inns in London. In 1584–5, the Queen's Men returned to Norwich, and they are recorded in the city books receiving 40 shillings in 1585–6. They played in the city on 10 December 1589, likely an Advent performance in the New Hall, and returned for another on 22 April 1590, "when the Tuürke wente vponn Roppes at newhall".

Siobhan Keenan has noted that the affray at the Red Lion and the earlier 1583 incident with the Earl of Worcester's Men "appear to mark the beginning of tenser relations between the Norwich Corporation and visiting players", with records of disputes between them and civic authorities seeing a gradual increase after this point in time. The Norwich chamberlains and Mayor's court also became more rigorous in their recording of visits from players than they had in the 40 years previous, and Norwich record-keepers regularly noted the payments that were being made as a substitute for prohibited plays. Payments to players of the Earl of Leicester and Earl of Oxford 1584–5 were specifically made such that "they should not playe in the Citie". By 1588, there were Norwich records of permissions for what were likely performances in non-civic venues, without payments from the city. On 4 September that year, there was the first Norwich restriction on the number of days players could perform in the city when the Earl of Leicester's players were paid 40 shillings "So as they pley not aboue ij [daies] tymes and then depart". Mayor Simon Bowde on 10 February 1589 referenced the murder when placing a ban on attendance at plays in the city, though this ban did not appear to affect the Queen's Men's performances. In the Jacobean era, players were still occasionally paid not to perform, and permitted acts saw increasingly strict regulation on their activities. While Robert-Smith has noted that this increase in restrictions and record-keeping may have been a response to the incident at the Red Lion, she has argued the changes were more likely responding to "a need for the city officials to address the concerns of particular groups of citizens", including the city's increasingly powerful Puritan faction and those wary of the rise in poverty as they perceived the poor to be idle and did not want them to disrupt the work day.

The spacious yard in which the performance took place still remains, though likely in a different form to what existed in 1583. The Red Lion itself is no longer extant.

== Historiography ==
There are several unclear aspects to the events of the Norwich Affray which have been debated by historians, including the motives behind individuals' actions, the identity of 'George', and the play the Queen's Men were performing.

=== Attempts to identify the play ===
The name of the play that the Queen's Men were performing when the incident took place was not recorded in any of the depositions of the event. Keenan has argued that it is not possible to identify the specific play that was being performed as information is too limited, but a range of plays can be narrowed down, whereas Kara Northway has said that "it is unlikely that we can decide with any confidence what play the Queen's Men were presenting."

What is known from the depositions is that the play was staged in costume as Bentley was described as wearing "a players berd vppon his face". They further confirm that props including multiple swords were used as Bentley had a "raper in his hand" when leaving the stage and Singer had an "Armynge Sworde". These swords were likely genuine as they were able to kill George. Bentley was playing a duke, eliminating some known Queen's Men plays as candidates. The play cannot have been written after 1583, and was likely in the Queen's Men's repertory at the time.

Keenan has made the case that the play may have been The Famous Victories of Henry V; it was in the repertory of the Queen's Men in the 1580s, does not date later than 1583, and contains a duke. It requires a Duke of York character, martial action, characters wielding swords, and a cast of twelve men which was appropriate for the group's 1583 size. The play is rowdy and nationalistic, involving violence and slapstick comedy. Keenan also put forward that an alternative may have been a lost play involving a duke as a lead role or authority figure.

=== Motives of involved individuals ===
While some commentators such as Keenan note that Bentley's decision to leave the stage was "consciously theatrical and partly designed to thrill the audience", other historians describe it as proof of acting troupes' aggressiveness and arrogance during that period. Keenan wrote in 2002 that records of the event provided "evidence that touring companies could be fiercely protective of their business interests." Roberts-Smith has suggested that once Winsdon knocked the gate money onto the ground, Tarlton and Bentley may have believed Winsdon was trying to steal the money rather than simply enter without paying, as it may have been a large sum.

Brown's motives behind joining the affray are also unclear as his deposition said that he was trying to stand up for servants to the Queen, though Keenan has suggested that "he may simply have been seeking to veil his violent behaviour with a palatable justification." Northway has criticised Keenan's perspective as an "example of erroneously thinking about the murder as if it happened in the context of playgoing," instead suggesting that Brown constructed his own meanings out of the violence, and thus his own purpose.

Keenan has further questioned whether George's actions were genuinely in defence of Winsdon, or an attempt to encourage Winsdon to either retain or re-employ him. While George referred to Winsdon as his master, according to the deposition of Elizabeth Davy George "was not his seruante but he had been hym aboute three or iiijor [four] dayes". This is an unclear statement that may have either meant he was either only Winsdon's servant for that short time, or had ceased to be his servant that amount of time prior to the affray.

There is some agreement among historians that the Norwich justices were unwilling to press a case against the Queen's Men.

=== Summaries of the incident ===
Multiple scholars have summarised the events of the Norwich Affray, with some disagreement between each other. Northway in 2008 argued that past summaries of the incident "misinterpret the event, specifically the role of the audiences," and that "Critics' enthusiasm for the early success of the theatre leads to a bizarre value system privileging the lives of actors over those of audience members". She criticised the other historians' portrayal of George as an innocent victim of circumstances.
