= Serbian singers =

Serbian singers may refer to:

- Singers from Serbia, singers who are from Serbia
- Serbs singers, singers who are ethnic Serbs

== See also ==
- Serbian (disambiguation)
- Singer (disambiguation)
