= Singe (surname) =

Singe is a surname. Notable people with the surname include:

- Arthur Singe (1898–1936), New Zealand rugby league player
- Shane Singe (born 1980), New Zealand cricketer
- William Singe (born 1992), Australian YouTuber, singer, songwriter, and producer

== See also ==
- Singe (disambiguation)
- Singer (surname)
