= Goshin (disambiguation) =

Goshin is a bonsai created by John Y. Naka.

Goshin may also refer to:

- Kodokan Goshin Jutsu, a martial arts form
- Gōshin, Japanese nise-e artist
