= Ouvry =

Ouvry may refer to:

- Frederic Ouvry (1814–1881), English lawyer and antiquary
- Ouvry Lindfield Roberts (1898-1986), senior officer of the British Army and the British Indian Army during World Wars I and II
- Ouvry, a French company in the textile sector that specialises in CBRN personal protective equipment
