= Peter Singer (disambiguation) =

Peter Singer (born 1946) is an Australian philosopher concerned with treatment of animals and other ethical topics.

Peter Singer may also refer to:

- Peter Singer (judge) (1944-2018), judge of the High Court of England and Wales
- Peter A. Singer (born 1960), Canadian physician and bioethicist
- P. W. Singer (Peter Warren Singer, born 1973/74), American scholar of politics and war, and author

== See also ==
- Singer (surname)
