= Jerome Singer =

Jerome Singer may refer to:

- Jerome E. Singer (1934–2010), American psychologist
- Jerome L. Singer (1924–2019), American clinical psychologist
