= Senger =

Senger is a German surname. Notable people with the surname include:

- Alexander von Senger (1880–1968), Swiss-born architect in Nazi Germany under Adolf Hitler
- Brittney Senger, Canadian politician
- Dante Senger (born 1983), Argentine footballer
- Darlene Senger (born 1955), American politician
- Ferdinand Maria von Senger und Etterlin (1923–1987), German soldier and jurist
- Frank Senger (born 1986), German politician
- Fridolin von Senger und Etterlin (1891–1963), German general during World War II
- Hayden Senger (born 1997), American baseball player
- Marvin Senger (born 2000), German footballer
- Werner Senger, German handballer

== See also ==
- Senger Line or Hitler Line, German defensive line in central Italy during the Second World War
- Sanger (disambiguation)

Media related to Senger (surname) at Wikimedia Commons
