= Frederic Ouvry =

Frederic Ouvry FSA (1814–1881) was an English lawyer and antiquary.

== Life ==
Born on 20 October 1814, he was the third son of Peter Aimé Ouvry, and nephew-in-law of John Payne Collier. Admitted a solicitor in 1837, he became a partner in the firm of Robinson, King, & Ouvry, in Tokenhouse Yard; later he joined the firm of his brothers-in-law, the Messrs. Farrers, at 66 Lincoln's Inn Fields. Among his clients was Charles Dickens, and Ouvry acted for him in his separation from Catherine Dickens. Dickens, also a friend, depicted him in Household Words as "Mr. Undery".

On 24 February 1848 Ouvry was elected fellow of the Society of Antiquaries of London, and was placed on the council of the society in 1850. For twenty years (1854–74) he filled the office of treasurer. On his resignation he was made vice-president, and on 4 January 1876 was unanimously elected president. He retired in 1878. He presented the society with valuable books, and a portrait of William Oldys.

Ouvry was also a member of the Weavers' Company, one of the treasurers of the Royal Literary Fund, and a member of other literary societies. He died suddenly at 12 Queen Anne Street, London on 26 June 1881, and was buried at Acton. His library of manuscripts, autograph letters, and printed books, including the first four folios of Shakespeare, was sold in April 1882, and produced over £6,000. A catalogue of his collection of old ballads, compiled by Thomas William Newton, was printed in 1887.

== Works ==
Ouvry printed facsimiles of rare publications, of which only one copy was known. These included:

- The Cobler of Canterburie (of 1608), 1862.
- Til Eulenspiegel's Howleglas, (the translation printed by William Copland), 1867.
- Gervase Markham, The Famous Whore, 1868.
- Thomas Cranley, Amanda, 1869.
- Petitions and Answers, (pieces printed in 1668), 1870.
- Letters addressed to T. Hearne, 1874.
- John Singer (attributed), Quips upon Questions, 1875.
- Nicholas Breton, The Passionate Shepherd, 1877.

Ouvry contributed two papers to Archæologia (xxxv. 379–82 and xxxvi. 219–41).

== Notes ==
Attribution

This article incorporates text from a publication now in the public domain: Lee, Sidney, ed. (1895). "Ouvry, Frederic". Dictionary of National Biography. Vol. 42. London: Smith, Elder & Co.
