= John Singer =

John Singer may refer to:

- Seymour Jonathan Singer (1924–2017), cell biologist and author
- John Singer (homeschooler) (1931–1979), American killed in a standoff over homeschooling
- John Singer (actor, born 1923) (1923–1987), English actor
- John Singer (16th-century actor) (fl. 1594–1602?), English actor and dramatist
- John Webb Singer (1819–1904), British businessman
- John Singer, a mute character in Carson McCullers' novel The Heart Is a Lonely Hunter (1940)

== See also ==
- Jonathan Singer (disambiguation)
- John Singer Sargent
