= Sanger =

Sanger may refer to:

== Places ==
=== Romania ===
- Sânger, a commune in Mureș County

=== United States ===
- Sanger, California, a city in the San Joaquin Valley
- Sanger, North Dakota, a ghost town
- Sanger, Texas, a city
- Sanger, West Virginia, an unincorporated community

== People ==
- Sanger (surname), including a list of people with the name

== Other uses ==
- Wellcome Trust Sanger Institute, a genome research centre in Cambridgeshire, England
- Sanger (fortification) or sangar, a small temporary fortified position
- Sandwich, colloquially called a "sanger" in Australian and Scottish English

== See also ==
- Sanger-Harris, a former department store
- Sänger (disambiguation)
