= Yamaki Pine =

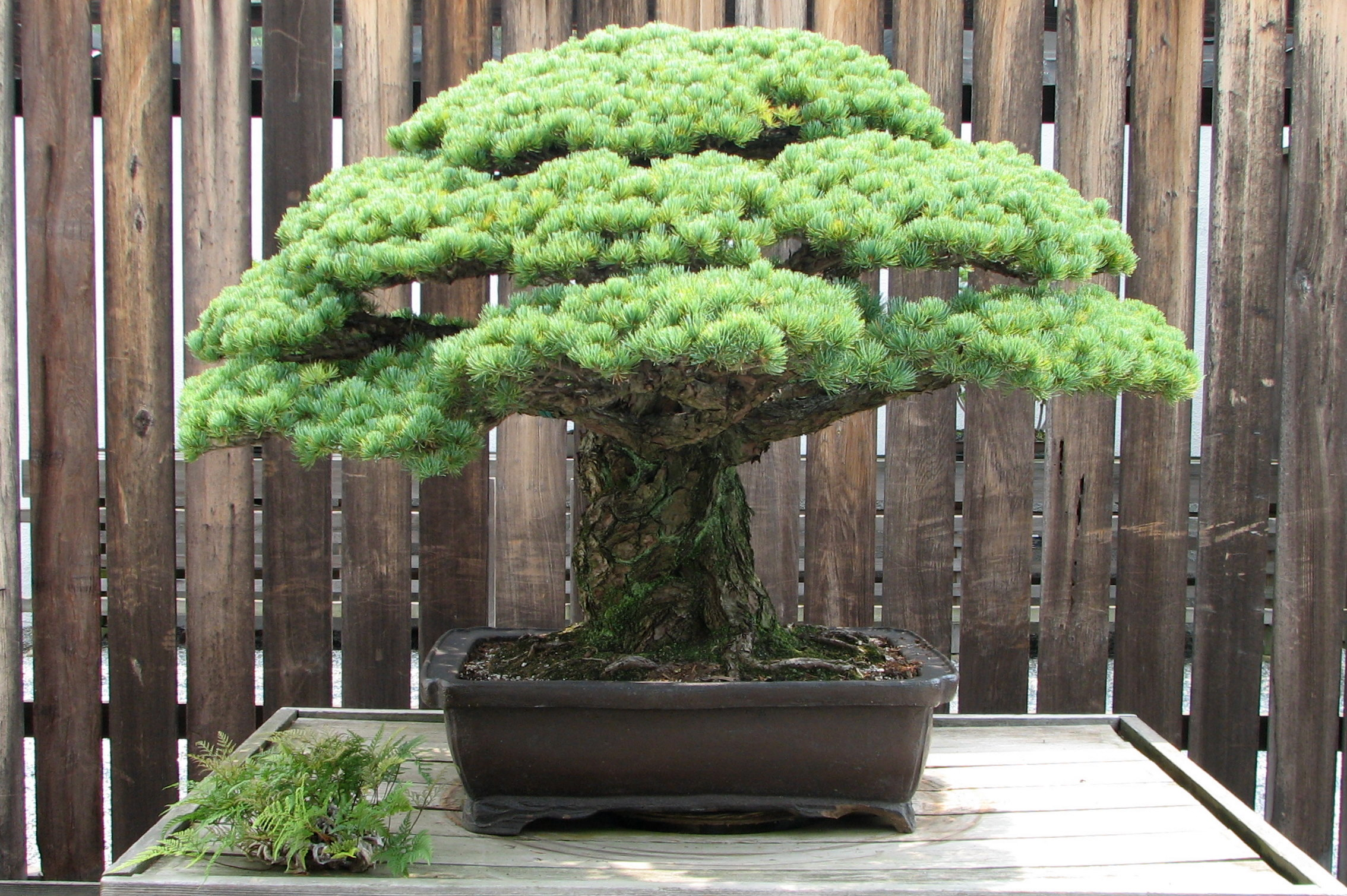
The Yamaki Pine is a Japanese white pine that has been in training since 1625

The Yamaki Pine is a Japanese white pine (Pinus parviflora 'Miyajima') bonsai established in 1625 that survived the atomic bombing of Hiroshima. The tree is reported by officials of the Potomac Bonsai Association to have survived the bombing by being sheltered by a garden wall in its original growing location. Also known as the "Hiroshima Survivor" and “Peace Tree”, the bonsai is based at the National Bonsai & Penjing Museum in the museum’s Japanese Pavilion. Bonsai master Masaru Yamaki donated the pine in 1976 among 53 bonsai gifted by Japan to the United States as part of Japan’s congratulations to America on the occasion of its bicentennial.

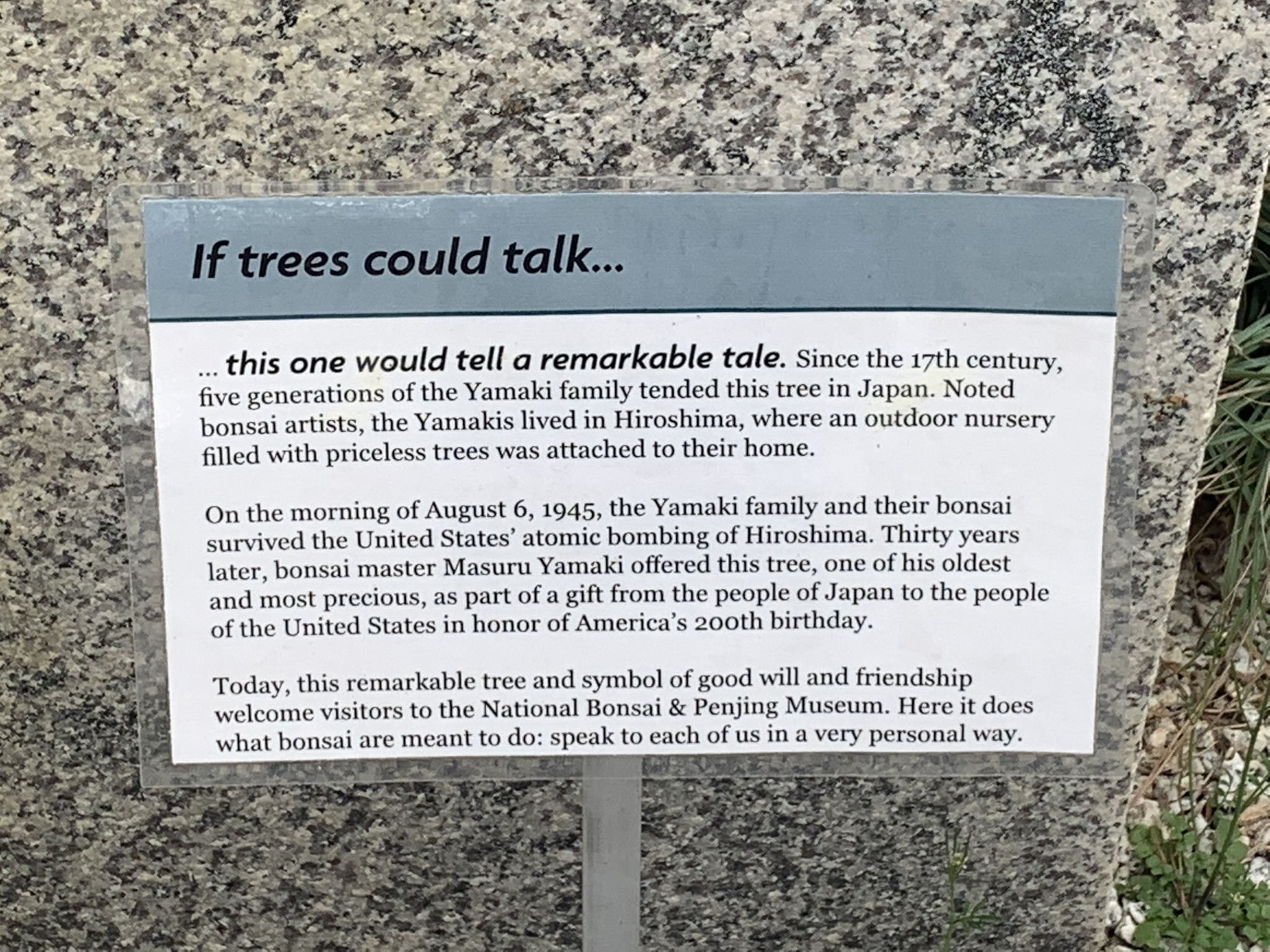
The sign describes the tree
