= Jonathan Singer =

Jonathan Singer may refer to:

- Jonathan Singer (politician), Colorado state legislator
- Jonathan Singer (journalist), progressive blogger
- Jonathan M. Singer, podiatrist and photographer
- Jon Singer, Shockwave Radio Theater
- Seymour Jonathan Singer, American cell biologist

== See also ==
- John Singer (disambiguation)
