= The Singer =

The Singer may refer to:

== Film ==
- The Singer, the English release title of the 2006 film Quand j'étais chanteur, directed by Xavier Giannoli
- The Singer, an unmade biopic about Héctor Lavoe
- The Singer, a 2018 film directed by Steven Swancoat, starring Tayler Hamilton, James Kemp, Denis Woychuck, Mark DeMaio, Rachel Guest, and Arlo McGowan.

== Theatre ==
- The Singer, a 2026 play by Cora Bissett, with music and lyrics by KT Tunstall

== Music ==
- "The Singer", poem by Edward Shanks set by Ivor Gurney
- "The Singer", a version of "The Folk Singer" by Nick Cave and the Bad Seeds

=== Albums ===
- The Singer (Liza Minnelli album), a 1973 album by Liza Minnelli
- The Singer (Diamanda Galás album), a 1992 album by Diamanda Galás
- The Singer (Lesley Garrett album), a 2002 album by Lesley Garrett
- The Singer (Teitur Lassen album), a 2008 album by Teitur Lassen

== See also ==
- Singer
- Singer (disambiguation)
