= Burr Singer =

American painter (1912–1992)

- Born: November 20, 1912; St. Louis, Missouri, U.S.
- Died: November 18, 1992 (aged 79); Los Angeles, California, U.S.

Bernice Lee ("Burr") Singer (born St. Louis, Missouri November 20, 1912; died Los Angeles, California November 18, 1992) was an American artist who worked in Social Realism subject matter, principally in watercolor, oil paint, and lithography. Singer is noted as a painter of African Americans who "spent the entire 1930s painting African-Americans because she said that nobody was painting them realistically. Everything else was stereotypical, caricatures."
