= David Singer =

David Singer may refer to:

- David Singer (poker player), American poker player
- David M. Singer, publisher of Deluxe Comics
- J. David Singer (1925–2009), American professor of political science
