= Singer (disambiguation) =

A singer is a person who sings.

Singer or Singers may refer also to:

== Business ==
- Singer Corporation, an American manufacturer of consumer sewing machines
  - Singer (Sri Lanka), a Sri Lankan home appliances and consumer electronics retailer; a former subsidiary of Singer Corporation
- Singer Motors, a defunct British bicycle, motorcycle and automobile manufacturer
- Singer Vehicle Design, an American company that specializes in restoring and modifying Porsche 911s

== Media and entertainment ==
- Singers (album), by Mount Eerie
- Singer (band), a Chicago musical group featuring members of Lichens/90 Day Men, U.S. Maple, and Town & Country
- Singer (Hunan Television), a Chinese TV series
- Singer (novel), a 2005 young-adult fantasy novel by Jean Thesman
- Marla Singer, female character from the 1996 novel Fight Club

== Other uses ==
- Singer (dog), a species of wild dog also known as the New Guinea singing dog
- Singer (naval mine), a type of explosive deployed by the Confederacy during the American Civil War
- Singer (surname), includes a list of notable people with the surname
- Singer Building, in which the Singer Corporation was based in New York City
- Singer railway station, located in Clydebank, West Dunbartonshire, Scotland
- Singers F.C., the original name of Coventry City F.C., an English professional football club

== See also ==
- The Singer (disambiguation)
- Singermann
