= John Naka =

American bonsai artist (1914–2004)

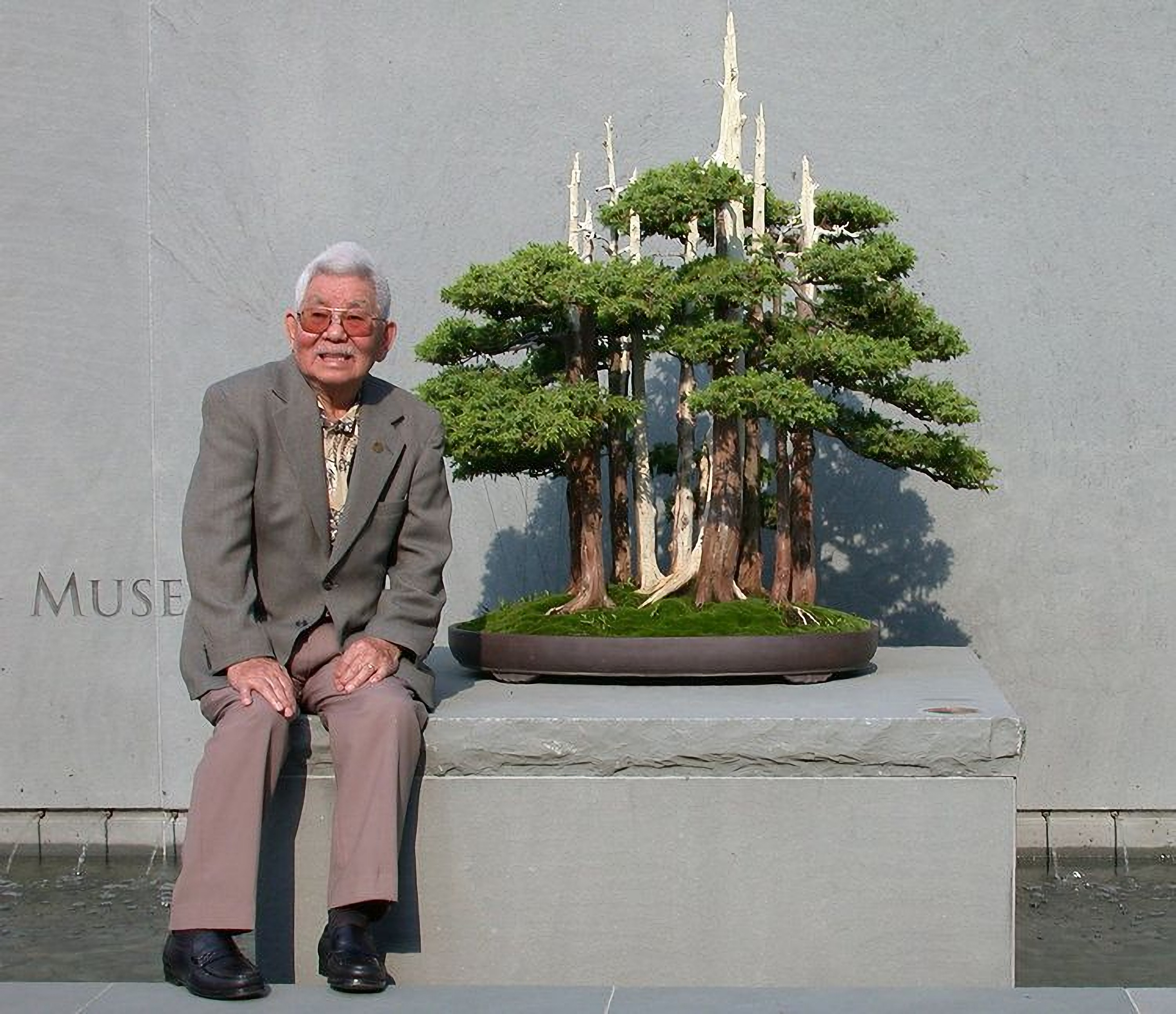
- Naka with Goshin
- Born: John Yoshio Naka; August 16, 1914; Fort Lupton, Colorado, U.S.
- Died: May 19, 2004 (aged 89); Whittier, California, U.S.
- Known for: Bonsai
- Notable work: Goshin
- Spouse: Alice Naka
- Children: 3
- Awards: National Heritage Fellowship; 1992

John Yoshio Naka (Japanese: 仲 義雄, August 16, 1914 – May 19, 2004) was an American horticulturist, teacher, author, and master bonsai cultivator.

== Life ==
Naka was born on August 16, 1914 in Fort Lupton, Colorado. He was born a Nisei Japanese-American, but at age 8 moved back to his parents' home country, where he extensively studied the art of bonsai due to his grandfather's influence.

He returned to the United States near Boulder, Colorado in 1935, and then in late 1946 settled in Los Angeles, California with his wife Alice and their three sons, Eugene, Robert, and Richard. Naka worked extensively with trees that were native to Southern California, rather than traditionally favored Japanese species, and helped popularize bonsai in the United States. In Orange County, Naka and four friends founded a bonsai club in November 1950, which is known today as the California Bonsai Society. He became a very important force in American bonsai art in the 1950s–60s. He was a driving force in the spread of bonsai appreciation and the practice of bonsai art in the West and elsewhere. Naka traveled and taught extensively around the world, at conventions and clubs, but refused to hold classes in Japan (where bonsai had been highly developed along certain lines over the centuries), saying "They want me to teach, and I tell them it's like trying to preach to Buddha."

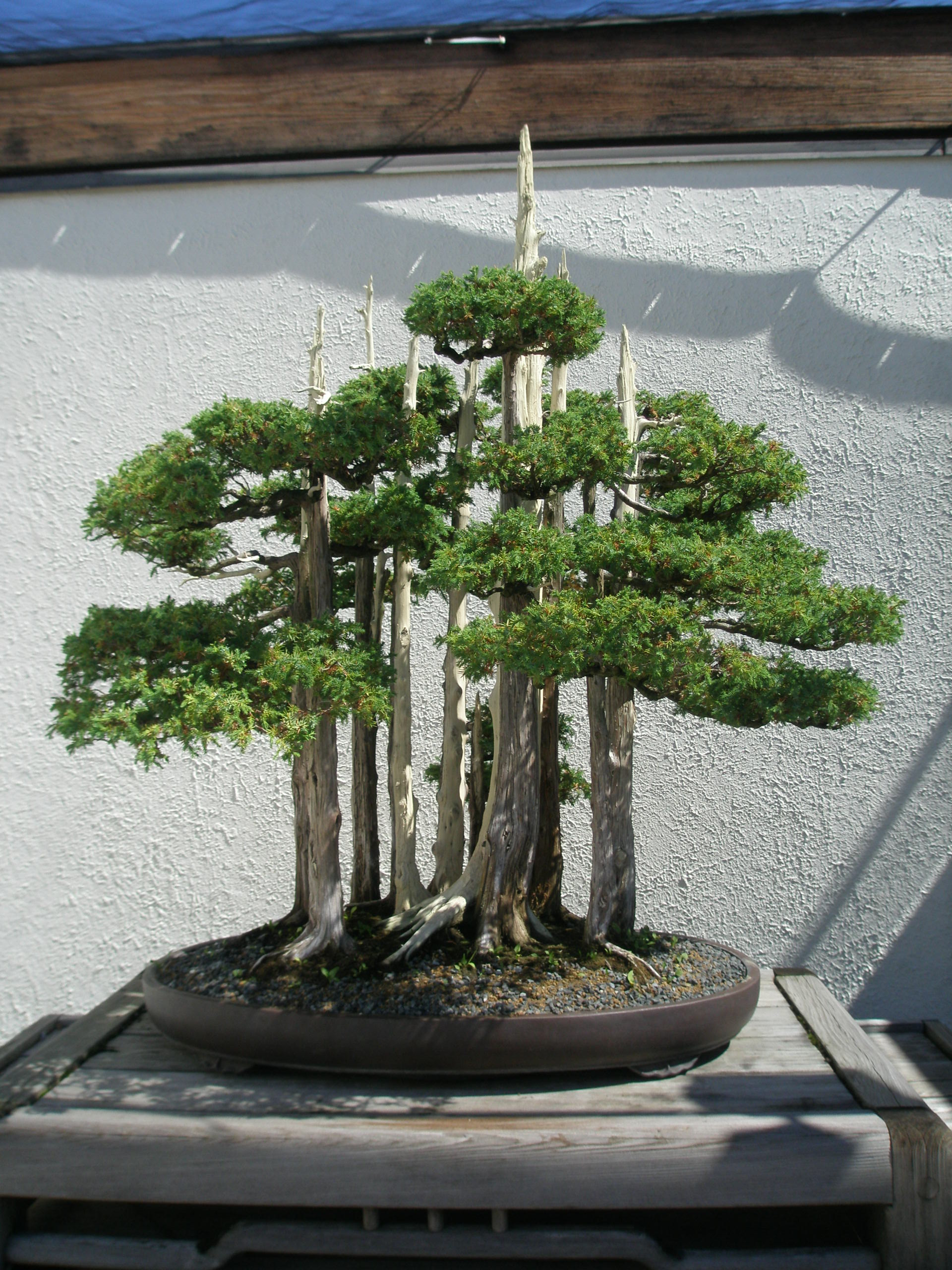
Naka's masterpiece Goshin is on display at the United States National Arboretum.

A very few of his many accomplishments are the following: He published two books, entitled Bonsai Techniques I and Bonsai Techniques II, texts that are revered as being the bibles of western bonsai to many artists. These books would be translated into French, German, Italian, and Spanish by 1990. He contributed articles, forewords, and photographs to a number of specialty magazines and books. Nina S. Ragle's compilation of 287 proverbs presented in both Japanese and English from Naka, Even Monkeys Fall Out of Trees, was published in 1987. (The title refers to the little recognized fact that, yes, even bonsai masters can make a mistake.) He was a founding director of the World Bonsai Friendship Federation (WBFF) and a co-signer of the Constitution of the Latin-American Bonsai Federation (LABF). He was an honorary advisor to the National Bonsai Foundation.

Other quotes of his included "Bonsai is not the result: that comes after. Your enjoyment is what is important"; "It must have philosophy, botany, artistry, human quality behind it to be a bonsai"; "The bonsai is not you working on the tree; you have to have the tree work on you"; and "Leave room for the birds to fly through" the branches of your bonsai. Of Naka's many works, the most recognizable composition is Goshin, which means "protector of the spirit." It is a group planting of eleven foemina junipers, each tree placed to represent one of Naka's grandchildren. The planting can be seen on display at the National Bonsai and Penjing Museum, located on the grounds of the United States National Arboretum. About a month before he died, Naka donated his very first bonsai, a Montezuma Cypress, to the National Bonsai and Penjing Museum. In May 2005, a collection of over 80 of his drawings of how he envisioned the future development of various workshop participants' trees was published as John Naka's Sketchbook, edited by Jack Billet and Cheryl Manning.

Naka died May 19, 2004 in Whittier, California.

== Awards and honors ==
On May 23, 1960, Japan's Minister for Foreign Affairs Shunichiro Fujiyama presented Naka with an honorary citation from the Japanese government for his effort in promotion of goodwill and friendship between Japan and the United States.

On November 24, 1967, Naka received an honorary medal and citation from the President of Japanese Agricultural Affairs Department, Prince Takamatsu and Eikichi Hiratsuka.

On May 20, 1972, the County of Los Angeles' Supervisor Ernest E. Debs presented Naka with an honorary citation on behalf of the County for "his outstanding contributions to the Japanese-American friendship by providing the people of Los Angeles and the nation with ability to understand and appreciate the beauty and significance of bonsai culture".

In 1985, Emperor Hirohito of Japan bestowed upon Naka the most prestigious award for a non-Japanese citizen, The Fifth Class of the Order of the Rising Sun.

In 1990, the North American Pavilion at the National Bonsai & Penjing Museum, on the grounds of the United States National Arboretum, was named in honor of Naka. Goshin is displayed at the entrance. In 2001, a portrait bust by Bonnie Kobert-Harrison was unveiled there.

Naka was chosen in 1992 as one of thirteen honorees to receive a National Heritage Fellowship, the first bonsai artist to receive this prestigious award. At the time he received his Fellowship, he said, "It has a beginning but no end. A bud today becomes a branch tomorrow."

He was awarded a 2009 Pacific Pioneer Award posthumously. The American Bonsai Society named the John Naka Award for him. An endowment fund was established in his name.

In May 2014, Naka became the first inductee into the National Bonsai & Penjing Museum's Bonsai Hall of Fame.
