= André Singer =

André Singer may refer to:

- André Singer (producer) (born 1945), British documentary film-maker and anthropologist
- André Vítor Singer (born 1958), Brazilian political scientist, professor and journalist
