= Florantonia Singer =

- Occupation: Journalist
- Employer: El País

Florantonia Singer is a Venezuelan journalist. Singer was an editor and reporter for the newspapers El Nacional and Últimas Noticias, and since 2017 has worked with El País of Spain. She has also collaborated with El Bus TV, an independent offline outlet. In 2021, she co-authored the book "Ahora van a conocer el diablo", published by Editorial Dahbar.

== Works ==
- «Ahora van a conocer el diablo» (2021, co-author)
