= Goshin =

Historic Chinese Juniper bonsai

Coordinates: 38.9121°N 76.9638°W

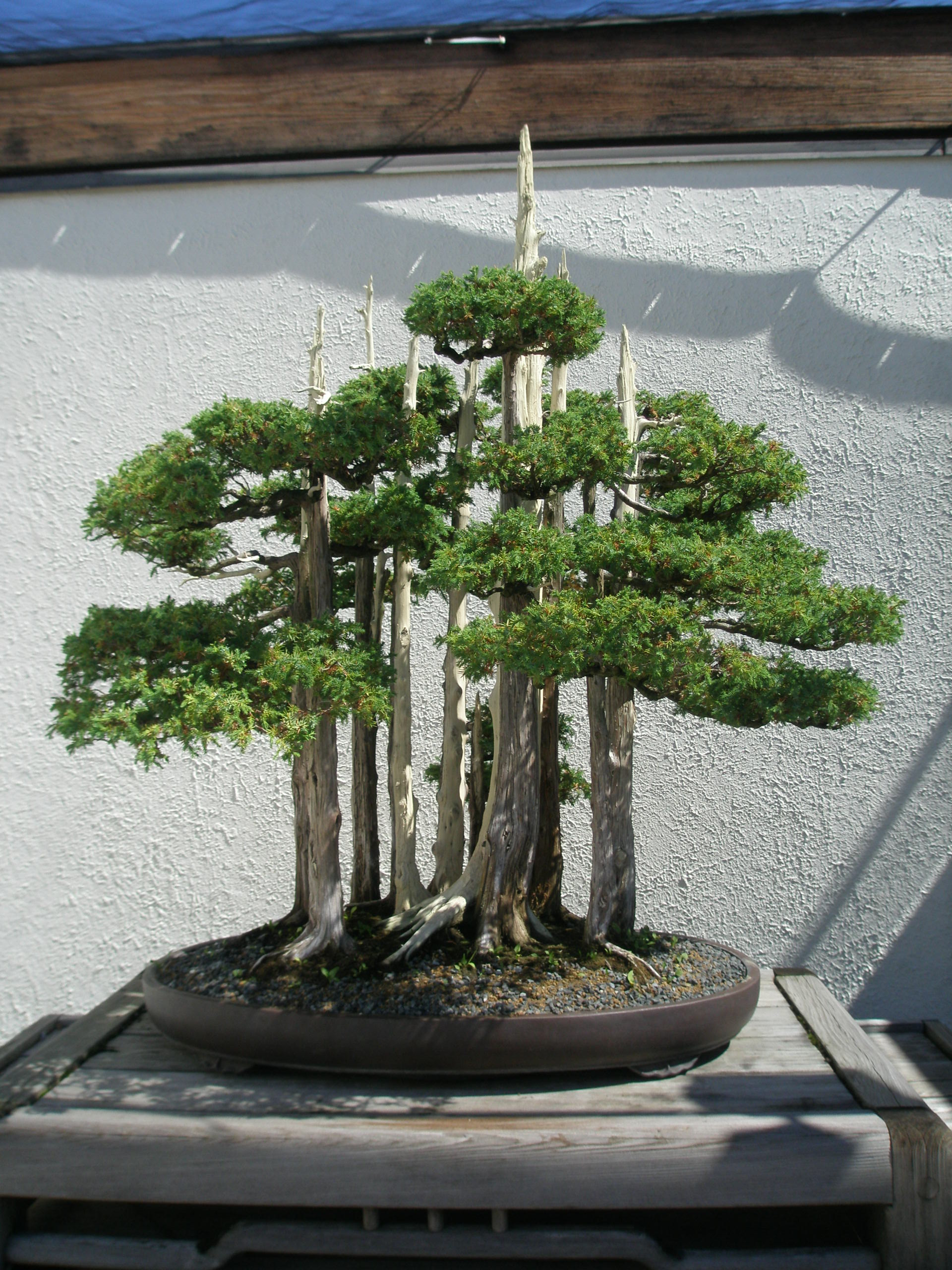
John Naka's masterpiece, Goshin, is on display at the United States National Arboretum.

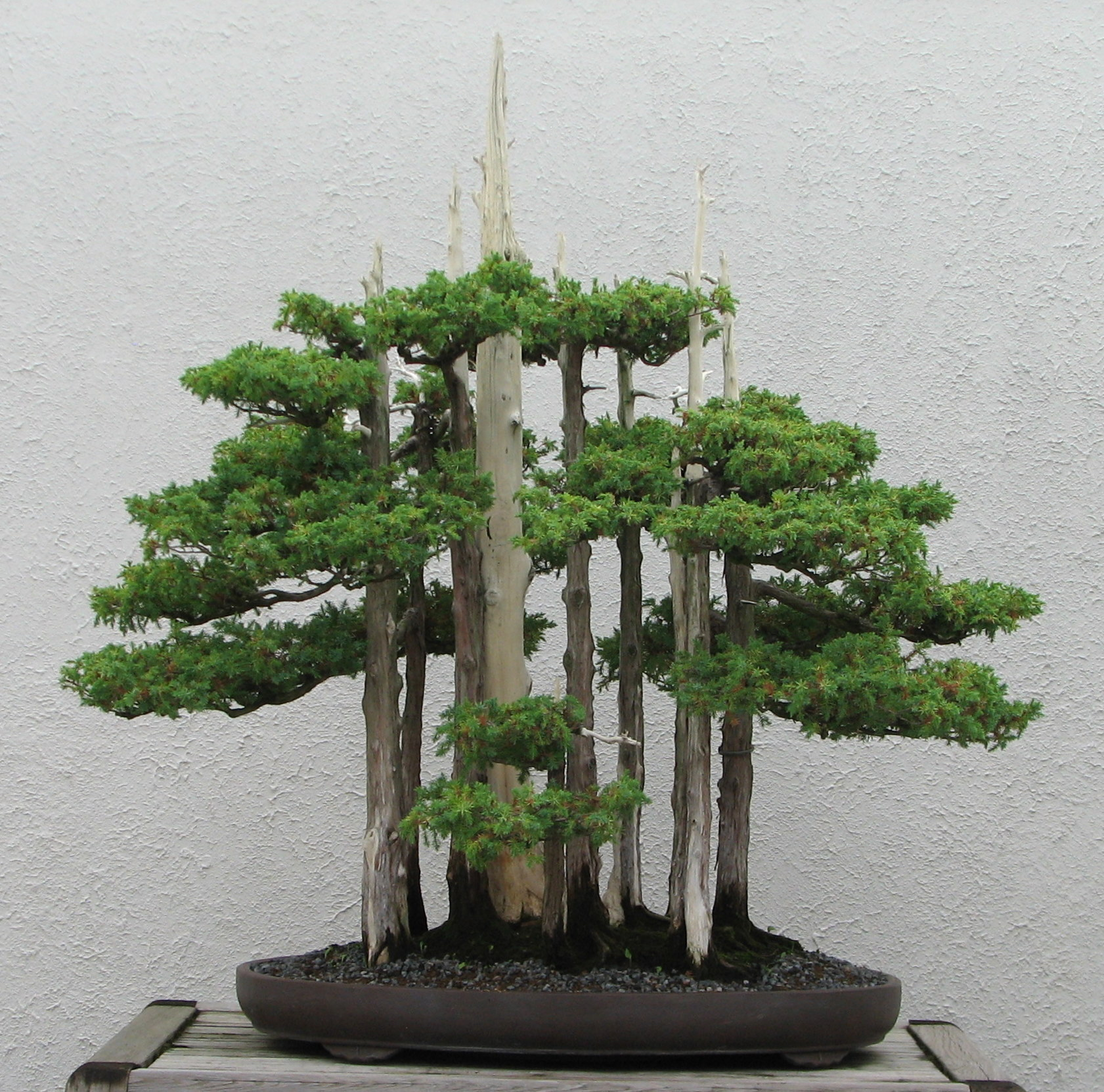
This view of Goshin is of the "back" relative to its usual presentation.

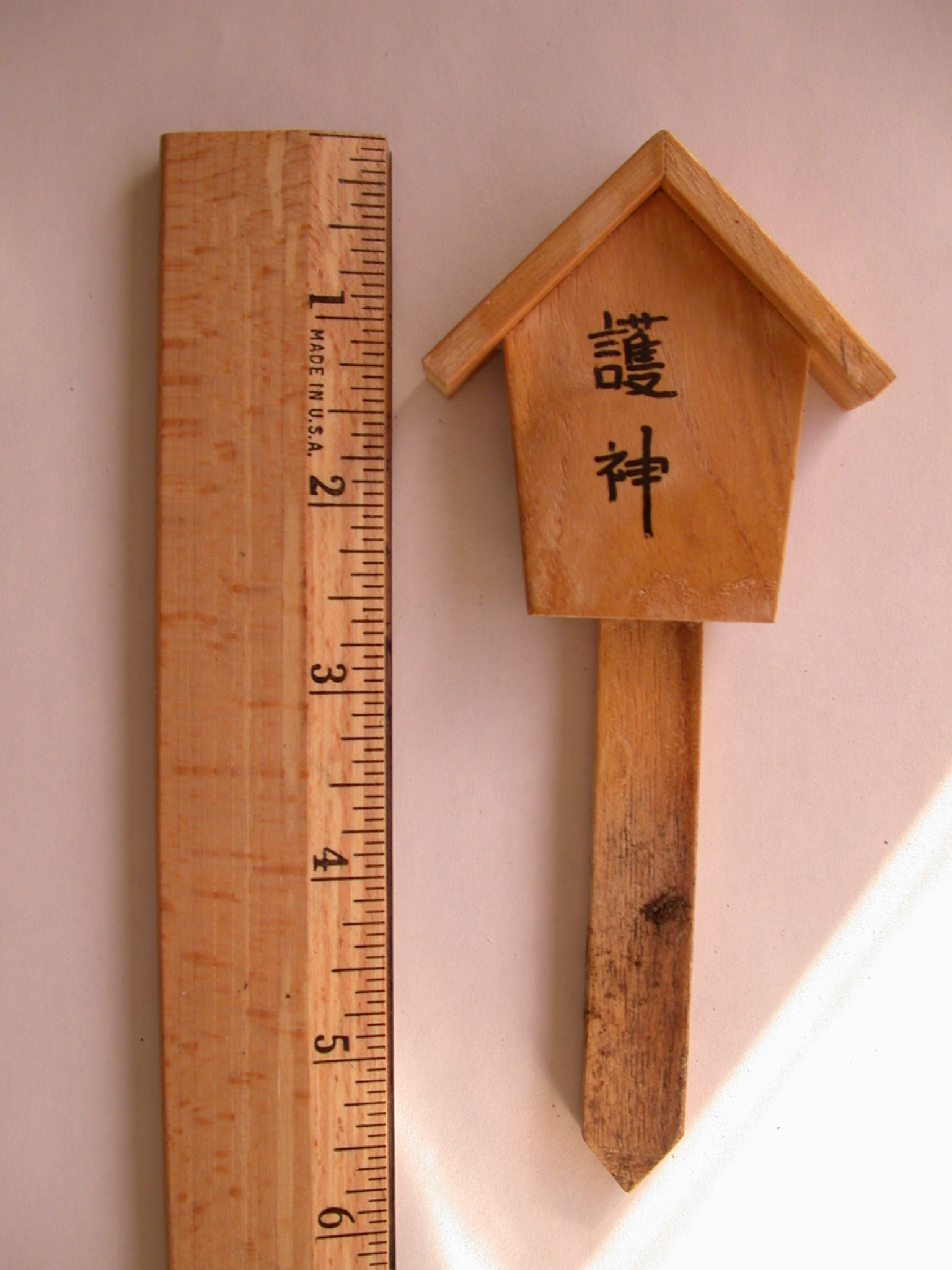
Historical Bonsai marker 201 Goshin (courtesy of US National Arboretum)

Goshin (Japanese: 護神, "protector of the spirit") is a bonsai created by John Y. Naka. It is a forest planting of eleven Foemina junipers (Juniperus chinensis 'Foemina'), the earliest of which Naka began training into bonsai in 1948. Naka donated it to the National Bonsai Foundation in 1984, to be displayed at the United States National Arboretum; it has been there ever since. The individual trees represent Naka's grandchildren.

== History ==
Naka began working with the first two of the eleven trees that would ultimately make up Goshin in 1948; he created a "two-tree style" composition using two Foeminia junipers of equal height. In 1953, Naka created a "formal upright" style Foeminia, during a demonstration for his bonsai class. He also acquired a taller tree (eventually to become the main, tallest tree of Goshin), which was replanted in the ground and gradually thinned and shaped; it was ready for showing by 1960.

Goshin first took shape as a forest planting around 1964. Inspired by a forest of Cryptomeria japonica near a shrine in Japan, Naka first combined the four trees he had already developed into a single, 4-foot-tall (1.2 m) composition. He soon added three more, to create a seven-tree forest bonsai. Naka also had to modify the pot to ensure adequate drainage—the lack of which caused one of the trees, and its repeated replacements, to die. At the time, Naka had seven grandchildren, each of which was represented by a tree. At the urging of fellow bonsai artists, he named his composition; he called the bonsai "Goshin", meaning "protector of the spirit", in reference to the forest shrine that inspired it. By 1973, Naka had eleven grandchildren, and he augmented Goshin concordantly.

In 1984, Goshin was displayed at the Philadelphia Flower Show in mid-March, where it was viewed by about 250,000 people. At the show's conclusion, Naka donated Goshin to the National Bonsai Federation (which he had helped launch in 1976), to be displayed in the new North American Pavilion (named in his honor) of the National Bonsai & Penjing Museum at the United States National Arboretum in Washington, D.C. Since 1984, Goshin has repeatedly graced the covers of prominent bonsai magazines, and it is one of the most widely recognized bonsai.

Naka returned frequently to Washington to check in on and supervise maintenance of Goshin, including extensive work in 1999. Later that year, he created another forest bonsai that is known as Goshin Two. When Naka died in 2004, one French site published a cartoon captioned (in translation): "John Naka has gone. A whisper of astonishment wanders in between the branches of Goshin."

== See also ==
- List of individual trees
