= Alex Singer =

Alex Singer may refer to:

- Alexander Singer (1928–2020), film director
- Alex Singer (soccer) (born 1987), soccer player

== See also ==
- Alex (singer) (born 1978), Danish singer, songwriter and actor
