= Holm Singer =

East German Stasi informant (born 1961)

Holm Singer (born 23 July 1961 in Reichenbach, East Germany) is a former East German Stasi informant who betrayed local church officials. He worked from 1980 till 1989 for the East German secret police under the pseudonym IM "Schubert". (IM stands for "inoffizieller Mitarbeiter", civilian informant.)

In March 2008, Singer has won an interim injunction to prevent an exhibition in Reichenbach from including his name and clandestine activities. On April 22, he "lost a legal bid to keep his identity from being made public" and the injunction was cancelled. The judicial process nevertheless continued and Singer's case was widely discussed in German media.

In March 2010, the court finally decided that the exhibition maker can make the real name of "IM Schubert" public. "The activity of the IM, who had repeatedly admitted his past deeds", said the acting judge, was "of historical interest".
