= I. M. Singer =

I. M. Singer may refer to:

- Isadore Singer (1924–2021), American mathematician
- Isaac Singer (1811–1875), inventor of the Singer sewing machine
