= Donna Singer =

American jazz vocalist (born 1965)

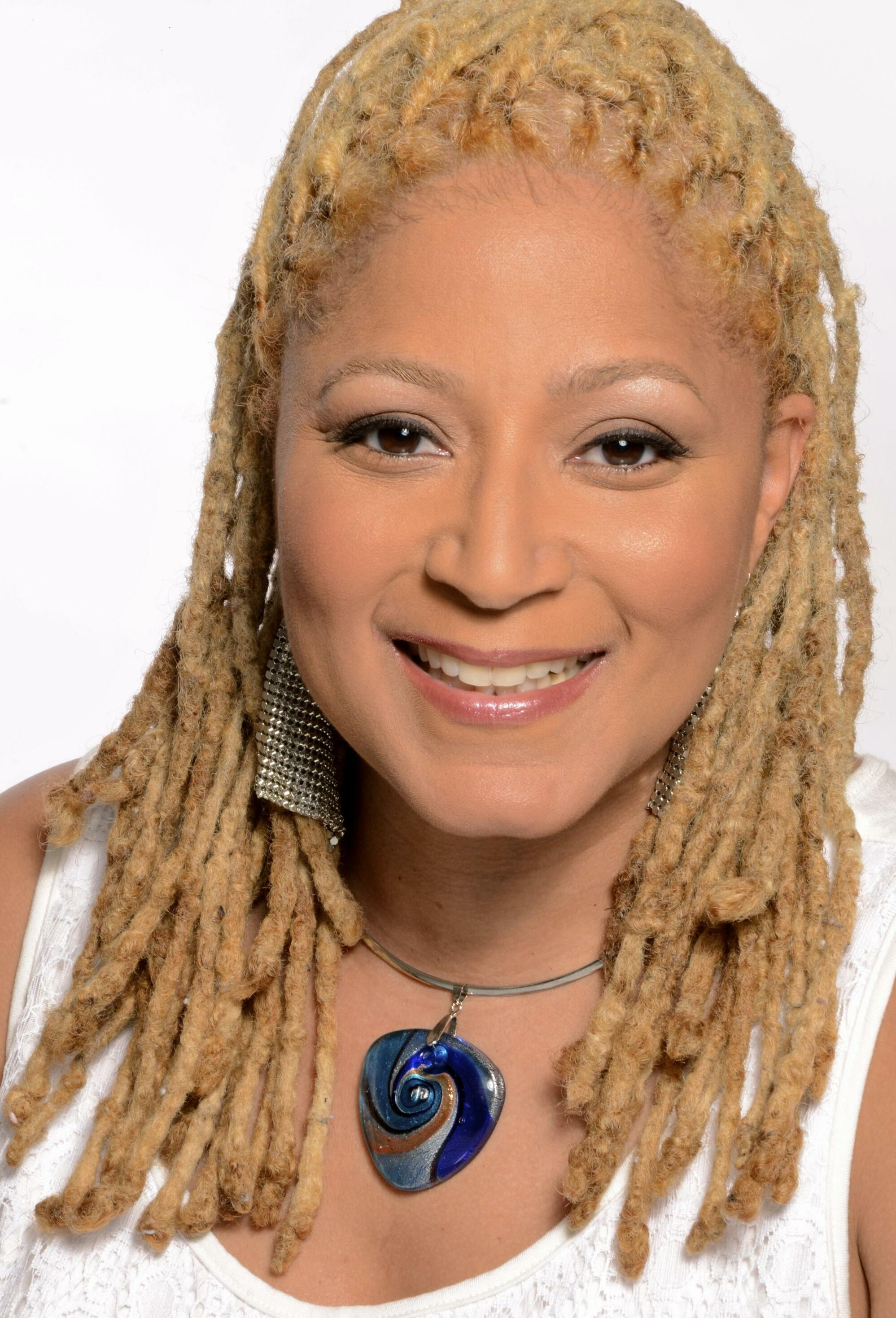
- Singer in September 2014

Background information
- Born: 1965 (age 60–61); The Bronx, New York City, New York, United States
- Genres: Jazz, Smooth Jazz
- Occupation: Singer
- Instrument: Vocals
- Years active: 1990–present
- Labels: Emerald Baby Recording Company, Inc.
- Website: www.donna-singer.com

Donna Singer (born in 1965) is an American singer and a jazz vocalist. She has performed songs by classical jazz composers such as George Gershwin and Arthur Hamilton, as well as original works by her husband, pianist and composer Roy Singer.

Donna Singer's jazz quartet participated in Uncool, an international artist-in-residence program for musicians. Her record label, Emerald Baby Recording Company, has released nine of her CDs: six with the Doug Richards Trio, and three with the Ranses Colon Trio.

== Biography ==
Donna Singer was born in 1965 in the Bronx, New York City. She and her twin sister, Dawn, were raised in a family that listened to the music of jazz artists such as Dinah Washington, Nancy Wilson, Sammy Davis Jr., Count Basie, and Lena Horne.

She graduated from the New York Academy of Theatrical Arts and later trained at Juilliard. After giving birth to her son, Christopher, in 1991, she began working as a pianist and music minister with the first Baptist church of Monticello, New York.

In the early 1990s, she started performing with songwriter Roy Singer, whom she married in 1997.

== Career ==
Donna Singer an American singer and a jazz vocalist. She has performed songs by classical jazz composers such as George Gershwin and Arthur Hamilton, as well as original works by her husband, pianist and composer Roy Singer.

Between 1995 and 1997, she released three gospel albums on the DRC Independent Record Label: An Intimate Christmas Night (1995), Hymns of God (1996), and Gospel Voices of Tomorrow (1997). In 1998, Singer began hosting a weekly gospel show called "Down by the River" on WJFF 90.5FM, a public radio station in Jeffersonville, New York. She hosted the show for six years. Her record label, Emerald Baby Recording Company, has released nine of her CDs: six with the Doug Richards Trio, and three with the Ranses Colon Trio.

=== The Doug Richards Trio ===
In 2010, she began collaborating with the Doug Richards Trio, which included the following musicians: Doug Richards (bass guitar), Billy Alfred (piano), and Mike Cervone (drums). Together, they released five jazz albums between 2012 and 2019.

In the summer of 2012, Singer released her first album with the Doug Richards Trio, Take the Day Off: Escape with Jazz, which combined jazz standards and original instrumental tracks. The album aired on over 150 stations globally. This album included Donna and Roy Singer's first original release, the self-titled track "Take the Day Off". It was written by Mitch Usher and Roy Singer. The album reached number 23 on the College Music Journal's jazz charts.

In November 2012, Singer and the Doug Richards Trio released another collaborative album, Kiss Me Beneath the Mistletoe, as a holiday jazz album. The album featured several original Christmas songs including "Kiss Me Beneath the Mistletoe" and "On New Year's Eve", both written by Roy Singer, and "Christmas In My Heart", written by Doug Richards.

In 2013, Singer and the Doug Richards Trio performed at the Saratoga Arts Fest and venues in the Catskill Mountains and NYC. The album Jazz in the Living Room was also released in 2013.

The fourth collaborative album, Destiny: Moment of Jazz, was released in 2014. Special guests on this album included Jeff Otis (guitar), Chris Pasen (flugelhorn), Nancy Wegrzyn (viola), and Bobby Tee (percussion/drums). Destiny: Moment of Jazz reached #25 on the College Music Journal jazz charts.

Feeling The Jazz, the duo's fifth album, was released in 2016. Special guests on this album included Jeff Otis (guitar), William Fleck (trombone), Karen Macklin (composer/violin), Siavani Bacani (violin), Ysauro Hernandez (percussion), and Valerie Solomon (graphic design).

In 2014, Singer and the Doug Richards Trio performed at the Nebraska International Jazz Series, also known as the Jazz in June concert series, in Lincoln, Nebraska.

=== Other domestic collaborations ===
Singer created the Jazz In Our Schools educational program for New York State high schools and elementary schools, which aimed to promote black history in the entertainment business during the 1950s and 1960s.

Singer performed for 15 years as the lead vocalist in the Swing Shift Orchestra in the Catskill Mountains, a 17-piece big band featuring the music of Count Basie, Glenn Miller, and Tommy Dorsey. She is heard on the Swing Shift Orchestra CD On Fire.

In 2015, Singer performed the National Anthem at Sunrise Stadium for the 50th anniversary NFL game for the Miami Dolphins as part of a chorus of 50 women singing in 4-part harmony. She also participated in the Fall Heartland Tour, centered around the Bethany College Jazz Festival and Iola Music Series in Kansas.

In 2016, Singer performed with the Donna Singer Trio, featuring Singer on vocals, Billy Alfred on piano, and Hunter Isbell on bass, at the United Methodist Church of the Palm Beaches in West Palm Beach, Florida for the Jazz in the Afternoon event. During this year, Singer also performed with The Gold Coast Community Band, alongside soloist Maestro Ken Wilbanks and his 100-piece orchestra. The performance celebrated the band's 40th anniversary in 2016. She continued to perform with the band through 2018.

In 2019, Singer began recording with the Venezuelan Ranses Colon Trio, which included Ranses Colon (bass guitar), Brad Keller (piano), and Adolfo Herrera (drums). Together, they collaborated on three albums.

=== International work ===
In the summer of 2016, Singer performed at the Uncool Artist-in-Residence program (an international artist-in-residence program for musicians) in Torino, Italy, and Poschiavo, Switzerland. As part of Donna's jazz quartet, she performed with Roy Singer (piano), Hunter Isbel (bass guitar), and William Fleck (trombone).

== Discography ==
Title	Details
Kiss Me Beneath the Mistletoe	Released: September 20, 2012; Format: Digital download, streaming
Take the Day Off: Escape with Jazz	Released: 2012; Format: Digital download, streaming
Jazz in the Living Room	Released: 2013; Format: Digital download, streaming
Destiny: Moment of Jazz	Released: 2014; Format: Digital download, streaming
Feeling The Jazz	Released: 2017; Format: Digital download, streaming
It's an Art to Follow Your Heart	Released: 2018; Format: Digital download, streaming
Set Your Heart Free	Released: 2020; Format: Digital download, streaming
La Di Da & Ho Ho Ho	Released: 2020; Format: Digital download, streaming
Take God's Hand – Single	Released: 2021; Format: Digital download, streaming
Make A Joyful Noise	Single; Released: 2021; Format: Digital download, streaming
Dance Band Boogie	Released: 2022; Format: Digital download, streaming
Santa Plays The Bass	Single; Released: 2022; Format: Digital download, streaming
Go and Seek the Light	Single; Released: 2023; Format: Digital download, streaming
