= French ship Singe =

Several vessels of the French Navy have been named Singe:

- French ship Le Singe (1744), a catboat launched in 1744
- French ship Le Singe (1752), a catboat launched in 1752
- French xebec Singe (1762), a Renard-class xebec launched in 1762
