= Carol Sanger =

American legal scholar specializing in reproductive rights

- Born: December 30, 1948 (age 77); Nuremberg, Germany
- Partner: Jeremy Waldron

Academic background
- Education: Wellesley College (BA); University of Michigan (JD)

Academic work
- Discipline: Family law
- Institutions: University of Oregon; Santa Clara University; Columbia Law School

Carol Sanger (/ˈsæŋər/; born December 30, 1948) is an American legal scholar specializing in reproductive rights. She is Barbara Aronstein Black Professor of Law at Columbia Law School. She is not related to either reproductive rights activist Alexander C. Sanger or his grandmother, the pioneering birth control activist Margaret Sanger.

== Biography ==
Sanger was born on December 30, 1948, in Nuremberg, Germany. She received her B.A. from Wellesley College and her J.D. (Juris Doctor) degree from the University of Michigan. She began her career as a lawyer in private practice before teaching at the University of Oregon Law School and then at Santa Clara University.

Sanger joined the faculty of Columbia Law School in 1996. She teaches and writes about contracts, family law, and abortion law in the United States.

She was named an honorary fellow of Mansfield College, Oxford for her “world-renowned scholarship in the common law of contract, women’s rights, and research in human rights law.” She was also a fellow at the Princeton School of Public and International Affairs.

Sanger delivered the 2018 Annual Distinguished Lecture for Boston University School of Law. She was honored by the academic journal The Green Bag for "exemplary legal writing" in 2013 for her article The Birth of Death: Stillborn Birth Certificates and the Problem for Law, which first appeared on the California Law Review.

== Personal life ==
Sanger's partner is former Columbia Law and currently New York University School of Law professor Jeremy Waldron.
