= Alexander C. Sanger =

American lawyer (born 1947)

Alexander Sanger
- Born: November 25, 1947 (age 78); New York City, New York, U.S.
- Education: Princeton University (BA); Columbia University (JD, MBA); New York University (LLM)
- Relatives: Margaret Sanger (grandmother)

Alexander C. Sanger (born November 15, 1947) is an American reproductive rights activist, and the former Chair of the International Planned Parenthood Council. Sanger previously served as a United Nations Population Fund Goodwill Ambassador, as the President of Planned Parenthood of New York City (PPNYC), and as President of its international arm, The Margaret Sanger Center International (MSCI), from 1991 to 2000. He is the grandson of Margaret Sanger, the founder of Planned Parenthood, who opened America's first birth control clinic in Brownsville, Brooklyn, in 1916. He is not related to reproductive rights legal scholar Carol Sanger.

== Early life ==
Alexander Campbell Sanger was born November 25, 1947, in New York City and grew up in Mount Kisco, New York. His father, Grant Sanger, a surgeon, was the second child of Margaret Sanger. His mother, Edwina Campbell, was a physician and was the granddaughter of William C. Durant, founder of General Motors.

Sanger attended the Bedford Rippowam School, Phillips Academy in Andover, Massachusetts and Princeton University. At Princeton, he wrote his senior history thesis on his grandmother, Margaret Sanger. After service in the U.S. Air National Guard, Sanger attended Columbia Law and Business schools, earning both an MBA and a JD, and then became an associate and then partner of the New York law firm of White & Case. During this time, he earned an LL.M. degree in Taxation from the New York University School of Law.

He joined the board of Planned Parenthood of New York City in 1984 and was elected President and CEO in 1990.

== Career ==
During Sanger's tenure as president of PPNYC during the 1990s, the organization rejected funds tied to the domestic gag rule, Title X, after the case Rust v. Sullivan lost in the U.S. Supreme Court in 1991. Such funds would have blocked PPNYC's medical providers from discussing abortion services. Under Sanger's direction, in 1993 PPNYC began the Clinician Training Initiative to address the decrease in doctors trained to perform abortions. More than 100 Ob-Gyn residents have since been trained through the program, and the Accreditation Council of Graduate Medical Education now requires all Ob-Gyn residents to be prepared to perform abortions.

Under Sanger's leadership, new penalties were imposed for attacks on abortion and family planning clinics in New York. In conjunction with the New York Civil Liberties Union and other allies, PPNYC worked to permit physician assistants to perform abortions across New York State. PPNYC also expanded access to contraception, including emergency contraception, methotrexate, and RU-486. In 1997 the Food and Drug Administration announced that six brands of birth control pills could be safely used as emergency contraceptive, after PPNYC filed a petition advocating for this outcome. When federal restrictions prohibited the spread of abortion-related information on the Internet, Sanger brought suit against Attorney General Janet Reno (Sanger v. Reno).

== Writing ==
Sanger publishes frequently on topics related to reproductive rights and justice. He has published numerous op-eds, journal articles, and letters to the editor. His book Beyond Choice: Reproductive Freedom in the 21st Century, was published in January 2004 by PublicAffairs.

== Involvement in the arts ==
After his retirement as president and chief executive of New York City's Planned Parenthood in 2000, Sanger took up drawing and watercolors. His work was exhibited at Planned Parenthood of Northern New England's gallery in Portland, Me and the North Haven Gallery, and at the Cunneen-Hackett Art Center in Poughkeepsie, NY. Sanger's photography has been featured in Maine Boats.

Sanger is trustee of the Virginia B. Toulmin Foundation, which funds programs for disadvantaged children, women's health, and the commissioning of new works by women in the performing arts, particularly composers, playwrights and choreographers. It originated the Opera America Discovery and Commissioning Grants to female composers and the Women Composers Readings and Commissions program through the League of American Orchestras. The foundation also supports the Luna Competition Lab, which targets high-schoolers, and funding for female composition students at the Juilliard School. The foundation has also helped establish an initiative for female choreographers at the School of American Ballet and fund a major study on gender equity in the theater world in 2016. Fighting to promote gender equality in the performing arts, Sanger offered seven leading American orchestras a chance at a $50,000 grant for a new work by an emerging female composer. However, only three orchestras applied.

== Education and recognition ==
Sanger holds a BA in history from Princeton University, an MBA and JD from Columbia University, and an LLM from New York University.

Sanger spoke at both the 1994 United Nations International Conference on Population and Development and the 1995 United Nations Fourth World Conference on Women. The news website Earth Times named Sanger “One of the 100 Most Influential People on the Planet” in 1995.

== Personal life ==
Sanger is married to Jeannette Watson, former owner of the Manhattan independent book store Books & Co. The couple has three children.
