= Daniel Singer =

Daniel Singer may refer to:

- Daniel Singer (journalist) (1926–2000), British journalist and socialist writer
- Daniel Singer (actor) (born 1959), American actor
