= James Singer =

James Singer may refer to:

- James Singer (bishop) (1786–1866), Irish Anglican bishop
- Jimmy Singer (1937–2010), Welsh footballer
