= Baruch Singer =

American businessman

- Born: 1954 (age 71–72)
- Occupations: real estate investor and developer
- Spouse(s): Vera Singer (divorced); Susie Singer
- Children: Yitzchok Singer

Baruch Singer (born 1954) is a New York-based real estate investor and developer.

== Biography ==
Singer was born to a Jewish family, the son of rabbi Yitzhak Singer. In 1983, while living on the Lower East Side and in the midst of writing his doctoral dissertation in clinical psychology at Harvard University, his cousin Rabbi Joseph Singer referred a local builder, David Disenhouse, to invite him as a partner to renovate a vacant apartment building on the Lower East Side. Singer accepted and this led to a ten-year relationship (ending when Disenhouse moved to Israel).

Singer specialized in purchasing and leasing distressed residential properties in Harlem, Hamilton Heights, Manhattan Valley, and Washington Heights. After an existing tenant vacated, he would renovate the apartment and then find tenants to replace the prior occupants. Although the buildings were often crime-ridden, Singer claims that he would make sure that the new tenants were told upfront about the problems they were moving into before signing a lease. Singer always lets tenants break a lease and personally meets every new tenant. He has been variously credited with or blamed for the gentrification of poorer neighborhoods by hipsters as well as being branded a "slumlord." Once he is able to renovate all the apartments in a building having churned through the legacy tenants, he completes the renovation by finishing the hallways and common areas enabling him to increase the rent in the now secure building to closer to market rates.

Singer was accused of being responsible for a 1995 collapse of a Harlem building that killed three people. Singer's company, Triangle Management, was the manager of the building at the time of the collapse. The company later purchased the building site. In 2005, he sold a portfolio of 104 buildings for $450 million to the Pinnacle Group and Praedium Fund. He has been criticized for not repairing the distressed buildings he purchases quick enough. Singer defends himself by stating that the buildings he buys typically have severe problems that take time to correct and that some tenants do not readily allow the landlord access to apartments.

In 2013, Singer sold a portfolio of 84 properties to Brooklyn-based Rainbow Estates Group, headed by Irving Langer and Leibel Lederman for $340 million.

== Personal life ==
He was married to Vera Singer. The two divorced and Singer married his second wife, Susie.
