= Jerome L. Singer =

American clinical psychologist (1924–2019)

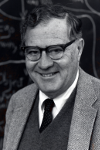
- Born: February 6, 1924; New York City, New York, U.S.
- Died: December 14, 2019 (aged 95); New Haven, Connecticut, U.S.
- Education: City College of New York; University of Pennsylvania
- Occupation: Clinical psychologist
- Employer: Yale School of Medicine
- Spouse: Dorothy G. Singer (m. 1949; died 2016)

Jerome L. Singer (February 6, 1924 – December 14, 2019) was an American clinical psychologist. He was a Professor Emeritus of Psychology at the Yale School of Medicine. He was a fellow of the American Psychological Association, the American Association for the Advancement of Science and the New York Academy of Sciences.

== Early life ==
Singer was born in New York City on February 6, 1924. He was educated at the City College of New York and at the University of Pennsylvania where he obtained his PhD in 1951. He was enlisted in the United States Army where he served as a staff sergeant from 1943 through 1946. In the Army, he worked in counter intelligence, serving in the Philippines, New Guinea, and Japan.

== Career ==
In 1963, he was recruited as a full professor and director of the clinical psychology training program for the City University of New York. Singer became considered "the father of daydreaming" and he "has laid the foundations for virtually all current investigations of the costs and benefits of daydreaming and mind-wandering".

To study daydreaming, Singer and co-worker John S. Antrobus of the City University of New York developed a questionnaire designed to measure the various dimensions that characterize the individual's inner life. They called this instrument the Imaginal Process Inventory (IPI).

Singer and co-workers described the IPI:

The 28 subscales of this self-report measure of ongoing thought predisposition attempt to sample various domains of mentation style (such as propensity for boredom or distractibility, rate of mentation, degree of visual or auditory imagery during daydreaming), orientation toward daydreaming more generally (for example, the degree to which an individual can become totally absorbed in fantasy activity, the degree to which daydreaming is accepted as relatively "normal and even desirable"), and specific fantasy patterns (such as sexual content, hostile-aggressive content, or fantasies of guilt).

Singer and his co-workers studied several aspects of daydreaming, including childhood development and daydreams, the psychotherapeutic use of daydreams, and drug use and daydreaming.

He worked in close partnership with his wife, Dorothy. They co-directed the Yale University Family Television Research and Consultation Center, which provided consultation to many influential children's television programs, including Mister Rogers' Neighborhood and Barney & Friends. He was a fellow of the American Psychological Association and the American Association for the Advancement of Science.

== Personal life and death ==
From 1949 until her death in 2016, he was married to Dorothy G. Singer, who was a senior research scientist in psychology at Yale. They had three sons, Jon, Bruce, and Jefferson.

Singer died at Yale New Haven Hospital in New Haven, Connecticut, on December 14, 2019, at 95 years old.
