= Saenger =

Saenger or Sänger may refer to:

== People with the surname ==
- Carsten Sänger (b. 1962), German footballer
- Eugen Sänger (1905–1964), Austrian aerospace engineer
- Eugene Saenger (1917–2007), American physician
- Maria Renata Saenger von Mossau (1680–1749), Bavarian nun executed for heresy and witchcraft
- Max Saenger (1853–1903), German obstetrician and gynecologist
- Oscar Saenger (1868–1929), singing teacher
- Willi Sänger (1894–1944), German Communist and resistance fighter against the Nazis
- Wolfram Saenger (1939–2026), German biochemist and protein crystallographer

== Other uses ==
- Saenger (spacecraft) (or Sänger), a spaceplane named after Eugen Sänger
- Saenger (crater), a lunar crater named after Eugen Sänger
- Saenger Theatre (disambiguation), various movie theatres in the Saenger Theatre chain

== See also ==
- Irene Sänger-Bredt (1911–1983) German engineer, mathematician and physicist
