= Singerman =

Singerman is a surname. Notable people with the surname include:

- Berta Singerman (1901–1998), Argentine singer and actress
- Paulina Singerman (1911–1984), Argentine actress and businesswoman
- Robert Singerman (born 1942), professor and Judaica bibliographer
- Wesley Singerman (born 1990), American record producer, songwriter and guitarist, and former actor
