= John Singer (16th-century actor) =

British actor and dramatist

- Occupations: Actor and dramatist

John Singer (fl. 1594–1602?) was an English actor and dramatist.

== Biography ==
Singer was with Queen Elizabeth's company and the admiral's (Lord Charles Howard, earl of Nottingham) at the Rose Theatre from 1594 to 1602. He played the part of Assinego the clown in ‘Tamar Cham’ on 2 October 1602, and received from Philip Henslowe on 13 January 1602 the sum of 5l. for his ‘playe called Syngers Vollentarye.’ He is said by Collier to have been ‘a great popular favourite, and the leader of a company of comedians, not at the Globe or Blackfriars, but at some theatre where[at] he was well known and greatly applauded’ (Engl. Dram. Pœt. iii. 209, ed. 1879). Collier credits him with the authorship of a collection of his merry sallies and improvisations given to the world under the title of ‘Quips upon Questions, or a Clownes Conceite on Occasion offered, bewraying a morallised Metamorphosis of Changes upon Interrogatories, shewing a little Wit, with a great deale of Will; or, indeed, more desirous to please in it, then to profit by it. Clapt up by a Clowne of the Towne in this last Restraint, having little else to doe to make a little use of his fickle Muse, and careless of Carping. By Clunnyco de Curtaneo Snuffe.

Like as you list, read on and spare not, Clownes judge like clownes, therefore I care not. Or thus: Floute me, I'l floute thee; it is my profession, to jest at a jester, in his transgression.

Imprinted at London for W. Ferbrand, and are to be sold at the sign of the Crowne over against the Mayden head near Yeldhall, 1600,’ 4to, 24 leaves (Hazlitt, Handbook). The ascription of this work to Singer, probable enough from internal evidence, rests upon the unsupported authority of Collier. The book, which is sad rather than comic, and consists of a series of moral platitudes conveying the idea that the writer was a thoughtful, serious, and kindly man, is of excessive rarity. A copy of it having come into the hands of Mr. F. Ouvry, a very limited reprint, now only less unattainable than the original volume, was issued (London, 1875, 4to).
