= Jonathan M. Singer =

Jonathan M. Singer was a podiatrist and a photographer from New Jersey in the United States. His original edition of the book Botanica Magnifica, consisting of five volumes, was recently donated to the Smithsonian Institution.

Singer won the Hasselblad Laureate Award and the 2009 Carl Linnaeus Silver Medal. Dr. Singer died June 22, 2019.
