= Timeline of Norwich =

History of Norwich, Norfolk, England

Coordinates: 52.628333°N 1.296667°E

The following is a timeline of the history of the city of Norwich, Norfolk, England.

== Prior to 12th century ==
- 900–950 AD – Anglo-Scandinavian ditch and bank constructed to north of River Wensum.
- 924 AD – Market active.
- 1004 – Norwich sacked by Danes.
- c. 1067 – Norwich Castle construction begins.
- c. 1070 – St Peter Mancroft church established by Ralph de Gael.
- 1086 – 23 to 30 churches, 43 chapels and 8,000 citizens recorded in Domesday Book.
- 1094 – Seat of East Anglian bishopric relocated to Norwich from Thetford.
- 1096 – Norwich School established.

== 12th–13th centuries ==
- 1100
  - Bishop's Palace built (approximate date).
  - St George Colegate church built (approximate date).
- 1101 – Norwich Cathedral dedicated.
- 1106 – Norwich fair active.
- 1110–20 – Bridge of St Martins built.
- 1100 – St Leonard's Priory built on Mousehold Heath.
- 1122 – King Henry I visits town.
- 1144 – William of Norwich murdered.
- 1145 – Norwich Cathedral completed.
- 1158 – Henry II grants the burgesses a charter.
- 1190 – Antisemitic massacre, Chapelfield well mass grave created.
- 1194 – Richard I grants the burgesses a fuller charter.
- 1216 – Dauphin Louis takes Norwich Castle.
- 1248 – Chapel and Hospice of St Mary's in the Field founded.
- 1249 – Giles's Hospital founded.
- 1258 – Penitential Friars settle in the city.
- 1266 – "Disinherited Barons sack city."
- 1272 – Riot.
- 1294 – City walls construction begins.
- 1295 – Bishop Bridge built.
- 1298 – Norwich represented in parliament by two members.

== 14th–15th centuries ==
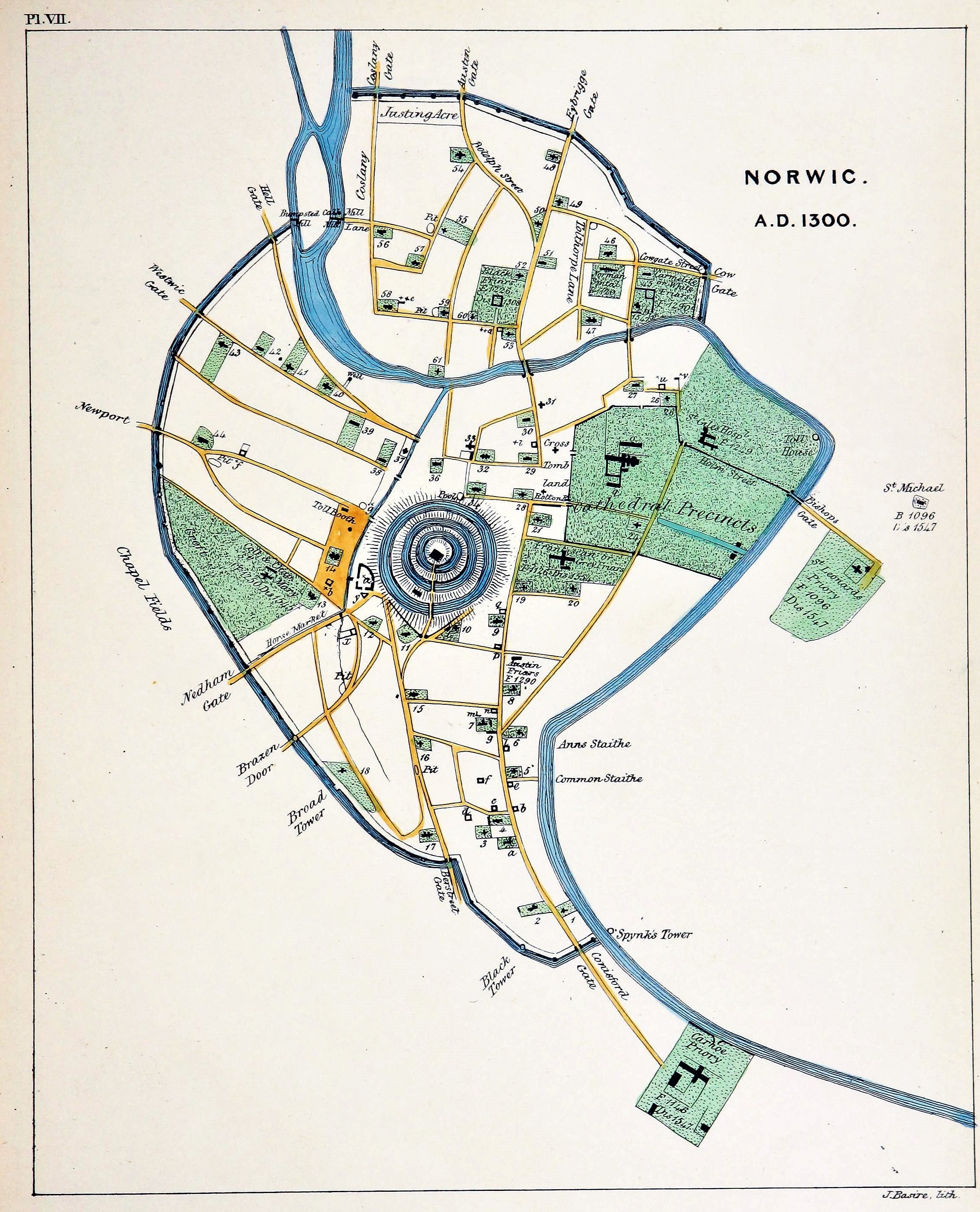
Norwich c. 1300.

- 1341 – Norwich Market ceded to city.
- 1342 – City walls built.
- 1349
  - Population: ~25,000.
  - Plague.
- 1383 – Queen Anne of Bohemia visits Norwich.
- 1384 – Cloth Seld established.
- 1385
  - Guild of Saint George founded (approximate date).
  - Guild Day ceremony established.
- 1404 – Charter defines the city and county of Norwich.
- 1411 – Market Cross built.
- 1413 – Norwich Guildhall completed.
- 1414 – Fire.
- 1430 – Great Hall built.
- 1443 – Gladman's Procession.
- 1455 – St Peter Mancroft church consecrated.
- 1472 – St Laurence's Church built.

== 16th century ==
- 1507 – Two fires on 25 April and 4 June destroy ~40% of Norwich housing, over 700 dwellings.
- 1510 – Church of St John Maddermarket rebuilt.
- 1520 – Population: up to 11,000.
- 1521 – Coslany Bridge rebuilt.
- 1532 – Group of women punished for selling grain below the set rate at Norwich Market.
- 1534 – Norwich is the first English city to receive a Rebuilding Statute from parliament.
- 1541 – Norwich Sanctuary Map created.
- 1543 – Hatters company formed.
- 1544–1545 – Plague outbreak.
- 1549
  - Kett's Rebellion.
  - Norwich is the first English provincial town to initiate compulsory payments to finance poor relief.
- 1554 – Russell company of weavers founded.
- 1555–56 – Plague outbreak and influenza epidemic.
- 1556 – Charter confirms the city boundaries, including the parishes of Carrow, Lakenham, Eaton, Earlham, and Heigham plus Mousehold Heath and Thorpe Wood.
- 1558 – The Cuningham Prospect, a perspective plan of the city, created.
- 1561 – Exports of Norwich worsteds from Great Yarmouth drops to 38 in a year.
- 1565 – Strangers (Dutch and Walloons) arrive in Norwich and French Church established.
- 1567
  - Duke's Palace completed.
  - Anthonie de Solempne sets up first printing press.
- 1570 – Census of the Poor.
- 1571 – 3,925 Strangers recorded in Norwich.
- 1573 – Fye Bridge rebuilt.
- 1576 – Almost 5,000 Strangers recorded in Norwich.
- 1578 – Queen Elizabeth I visits Norwich as the destination of her yearly Progress.
- 1579–80 – Bubonic plague kills over 5,000 people, possibly up to 40% of the population.
- 1584–5 – Bubonic plague outbreak kills at least 3,500 people.
- 15 June 1583 – The Norwich Affray interrupts a performance by the Queen's Men, resulting in murder.
- 1589 – Blackfriars Bridge rebuilt.
- 1589–92 – Bubonic plague outbreak kills at least 3,500 people.
- 1591 – Whitefriars Bridge rebuilt

== 17th century ==
- 1603–4 – Bubonic plague outbreak kills almost 3,500 people.
- 1608 – Norwich Public Library established.
- 1615 – Peter Gleane becomes mayor.
- 1621 – George Birch becomes mayor.
- 1625–6 – Bubonic plague outbreak kills almost 3,500 people.
- 1635 – Matthew Wren appointed Bishop of Norwich.
- 1636–8 – Bubonic plague outbreak.
- 1648 – The Great Blow explosion occurs after a riot, destroying 40 buildings.
- 1660
  - January – 14 Norwich aldermen and 25 common councillors sign the Norfolk Address to General Monck, expressing desire for a free parliament.
  - 24 May – Official thanksgiving held to celebrate the 10 May Restoration of Charles II.
  - 20 September – Norwich soldiery disbanded.
- 1652 – William Barnham becomes mayor.
- 1663
  - My Lord's Garden, Norwich's earliest known commercial garden, laid out.
  - William Oliver bookseller in business.
- 1666 – Final bubonic plague outbreak kills 2,500 people in a year.
- 1671 – King Charles II visits Norwich.
- 1675 – George Rose bookseller in business.
- 1681 – Duke's Palace rebuilt.
- 1687 – Doughty's Hospital established.
- 1693 – Population: 28,881.
- 1697 – New Mint established.

== 18th century ==
- 1701
  - Norwich Post begins publication as Britain's first provincial newspaper.
  - Oil lamps come into use in Norwich.
- 1706 – Norwich Gazette (later Norfolk Chronicle) and Norwich Postman (later Norwich Mercury) newspapers begin publication.
- 1711 – Duke's Palace ordered for demolition.
- 1724 – Maid's Head Lodge constituted, the first Masonic lodge in Norfolk.
- 1731 – White Swan Playhouse active (approximate date).
- 1741–1745 – Reverend Francis Blomefield publishes his History of the City and County of Norwich in instalments.
- 1745 – Temporary triumphal arch built to commemorate the defeat of the Jacobite rising.
- October 1746 – Public celebrations of the defeat of the Jacobite rebellion.
- 1747 – Local epidemic, likely smallpox.
- 1754 – Assembly House built.
- 1756 – Octagon Chapel completed.
- 1757 – Theatre built.
- 1758 – New Theatre built.
- 1762 – Hills and Underwood distillery in business.
- 1763 – Richard Beatniffe bookseller in business.
- 1770 – Gurney's Bank established.
- 1771 or 1772 – Norfolk and Norwich Hospital founded.
- 1775 – The Scots' Society (renamed Universal Society of Goodwill in 1784) founded on Saint Andrew's Day by Scottish expatriates.
- 1784
  - Blackfriars Bridge rebuilt.
  - Norfolk and Norwich Subscription Library established.
- 1785
  - First manned flight over Norwich by James Decker in a hot air balloon, launched from Ranelagh Gardens.
  - 22 July – Major John Money is launched in a balloon from Ranelagh Gardens and before being ditched in the North Sea.
  - 18 October – Society of United Friars founded at Crown Court, Elm Hill.
  - William Stevenson bookseller in business.
- 1786
  - Population: 41,000.
  - Norfolk And Norwich Benevolent Medical Society founded.
- 1792 – Hudson & Harvey bank established.
- April 1795 – Norwich Patriotic Society founded to agitate for parliamentary reform.
- 1797 – Norwich Norwich Loyal Military Association formed.
- 1800 – Fish's Musical Circulating Library in business.

== 19th century ==
- 1803 – Norwich Society of Artists meets for the first time.
- 1804 – St Miles Bridge built.
- 1811 – Foundry Bridge built.
- 1815 – Riots against the Corn Laws; Norfolk MP Thomas Coke is pelted with stones.
- 4 April 1817 – The PS Telegraph explodes after setting off from Foundry Bridge, killing 10 and injuring five.
- 1819 – Rosary Cemetery established.
- 1820 – Steward, Patterson & Stewards brewery in business.
- 1821 – Population: 50,288.
- 1822
  - Norfolk and Norwich Literary Institution established.
  - Duke's Palace Bridge built.
- 1823
  - J. & J. Colman in business.
  - Jarrolds relocates to Norwich.
- 1824
  - Norfolk and Norwich Festival begins.
  - Norfolk and Norwich Museum, and Norfolk and Norwich United Medical Book Society established.
- 1826 – Theatre rebuilt.
- 1827 – Norwich City Gaol built in Heigham Hamlet.
- 1829
  - Norfolk and Norwich Horticultural Society established.
  - Fye Bridge rebuilt.
  - Riots of over 3,000 weavers, who block access to workhouses and throw looms in the river.
- 1831 – Canal and harbour open.
- 1833
  - Norwich Yarn Company in business.
  - Carrow Bridge rebuilt.
- 1835
  - Town Council elected per Municipal Corporations Act 1835.
  - Guild Day ceremony formally abolished.
- 1837 – Bullard & Watts brewery in business.
- 1839 – St James Mill built.
- 1844
  - Yarmouth and Norwich Railway begins operating.
  - Foundry Bridge rebuilt.
- 1845
  - Norfolk News begins publication.
  - Norfolk and Norwich Archaeological Society established.
- 1847 – Chamber of Commerce established.
- 1849
  - January – Jenny Lind performs two charity concerts at St Andrew's Hall.
  - Norwich Victoria railway station opens.
- 1851 – Board of Health established.
- 1854 – Jenny Lind Infirmary for Sick Children opens, the second children's hospital in the country.
- 1856 – Young Men's Christian Association chapter established.
- 1857
  - Free Library building opens.
  - Norfolk and Norwich Anglers' Society formed.
- 1861 – Population: 75,025.
- 1866 – Chapel Field Road drill hall opened.
- 1869 – Norfolk and Norwich Naturalists' Society founded.
- 1874 – 10 September: Thorpe rail accident occurs near town.
- 1875 – Norwich High School for Girls founded.
- 1878 – Harry Bullard becomes mayor.
- 1880 – Chapelfield Gardens open.
- 1882
  - St Crispin's Bridge built.
  - Norwich City railway station opens.
- 1886 – Foundry Bridge rebuilt again.
- 1887 – HM Prison Norwich established.
- 1888 – Norfolk and Norwich Photographic Society established.
- 1891 – City College Norwich founded.
- 1897
  - Labour strike.
  - Royal Hotel in business.
- 1900 – Norwich Electric Tramways begin operating.

== 20th century ==
- 1901 – Population: 111,733.
- 1902 – Norwich City Football Club founded, inheriting the song "On the Ball, City".
- 1903 – Grand Opera House opens.
- 1909 – Sewell Park opens.
- 1910 – St John the Baptist Roman Catholic Church built, now cathedral
- 1911 – Picture House (cinema) opens.
- 1921 – Maddermarket Theatre founded.
- 1923 – First woman Lord Mayor.
- 1924 – Heigham Park opens.
- 1925
  - Wensum Park opened
  - The Ferry Boat Inn in business.
  - Whitefriars Bridge rebuilt again.
- 1928 – Eaton Park opens.
- 1929 – Sloughbottom Park and Mile Cross Gardens open.
- 1933
  - Waterloo Park opens.
  - Fye Bridge rebuilt again.
  - St Peter Hungate church repurposed as a museum, becoming the first church building to be given permanent secular use since the Reformation.
- 1938 – City Hall built.
- 1942 – April: Aerial bombing by German forces.
- 1963 – University of East Anglia established.
- 1973 – Colman's Mustard Shop opens.
- 1974
  - Norfolk Tower built.
  - Norwich Historic Churches Trust established.
  - Norwich and Great Yarmouth lose their status as county boroughs and become districts.
- 1976 – Norwich Buddhist Centre established.
- 1977 – Norwich Arts Centre opens.
- 1978 – Sainsbury Centre for Visual Arts and Norwich Cinema City open.
- 1979 – Norwich Puppet Theatre founded.
- 1980 – Sewell Barn Theatre opens.
- 1982 – City of Norwich Aviation Museum active (approximate date).
- 1988 – Norwich Airport terminal opens.
- 1992 – Norwich Research Park launched.
- 1994 – Norwich Central Library fire destroys over 100,000 books.
- 1995 – Norwich Playhouse opens.

== 21st century ==
- 2001
  - Norfolk and Norwich University Hospital founded.
  - The Forum built.
- 2004 – Norwich Heritage Economic and Regeneration Trust (HEART) established.
- 2005 – Delia Smith makes "Let's be 'avin' you!" speech at Carrow Road.
- 2006 – 99.9 Radio Norwich begins broadcasting.
- 2007 – Theatre Royal building refurbished.
- 2009
  - Norwich Film Festival begins.
  - 25 July – First Norwich Pride parade.
- 2018 – Colman's announces transfer of most of its mustard production away from Norwich.
- 2020 – COVID-19 pandemic.

== See also ==
- History of Norwich
- History of Norfolk
