= Bishop Bridge, Norwich =

Bridge and former gatehouse in Norwich, England

Bishop Bridge
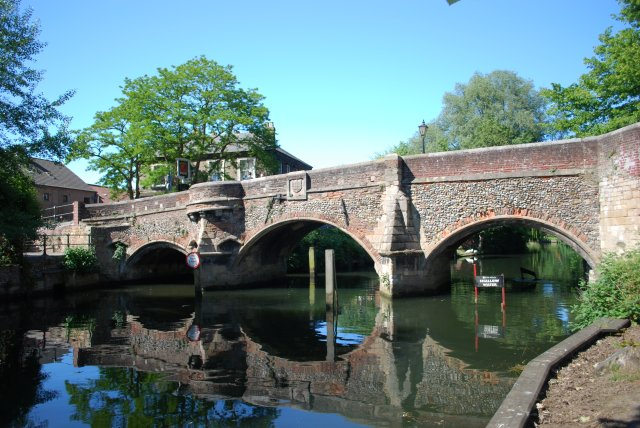
- Bishop Bridge in 2009
- Coordinates: 52.63244°N 1.30862°E
- OS grid reference: TG 23993 08991
- Carries: Bishopsgate
- Crosses: River Wensum
- Locale: Norwich, England
- Next upstream: Jarrold Bridge
- Next downstream: Foundry Bridge

Characteristics
- Material: Brick, stone, flint
- Width: 6.05 metres (19.8 ft)
- Clearance below: 3.2 metres (10 ft)

History
- Constructed by: Richard Spynk
- Built: c. 1340

Statistics

Listed Building – Grade II*
- Designated: 26 February 1954
- Reference no.: 1205642

Location
- Interactive map of Bishop Bridge

Bishop Bridge is a grade II* listed medieval bridge of brick, stone and flint across the River Wensum in Norwich, England. It is the only remaining medieval bridge in the city, located at the east end of the street Bishopsgate, east of the Norwich Cathedral. Bishop Bridge and its former Bishop's Bridge Gate were so named as they gave entrance to the Bishop's Palace. The bridge is scheduled as an ancient monument.

Initially a ford that was possibly on a Roman road, it later became a timber bridge. Permission for a more established bridge and gate was granted by Edward I in 1275, and Richard Spynk oversaw the bridge's construction in circa 1340. It featured a gatehouse atop its western side until 1790 when the gate was demolished to protect the bridge.

== History ==
The bridge is located upon what was one of only two fordable places on the Wensum in Norwich, the other being the site of Fye Bridge. It was possibly used as a crossing for the Roman road that ran through the city, known in medieval documents as Holme Street and presently as Bishopsgate.

In 1275, Edward I of England granted a patent to William de Kerkeby, the Prior of Norwich, to build a gate with a bridge across the Wensum that would replace an earlier timber bridge. Richard Spynk, a distinguished citizen of Norwich, financed the bridge in circa 1340, as well as the gatehouse. Spynk is also responsible for much of the financing of the city walls. The bridge was built by the Prelates of the See.

The bridge and gate were under ownership of the Prelates who repaired it until 1393, when the city took formal possession of it. In 1451 and 1481, ancient assessments for repairs noted that the Middle-Wymer ward was responsible for repairing the gate. In 1460, the wickets at the gate were kept by one soldier who let people in and out. Alderman John Gilbert died in 1467, and five years later his executers paid £50 for the repair of the bridge and the river banks. Two oak posts were put up at the east end of the bridge in 1486, marking the boundaries of the city.

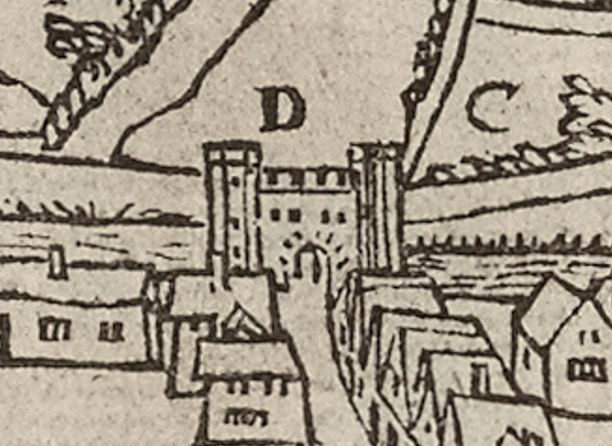
The bridge on William Cuningham's map of Norwich in 1558 retains both towers, despite one having been destroyed during Kett's Rebellion

The gate was attacked by rebels during Kett's Rebellion in 1549 despite being rampired with earth; rebels pulled the bars off its gates and entered the city before burning them. Kett's gunners hit the gate with cannonballs, leading a large part of the gate's wall and tower to be demolished. Its stonework was repaired as was the rest of the gate following the rebellion, using wood from Whitefriars Bridge. The bridge is depicted on William Cuningham's map of Norwich drawn up in 1558; both towers of the gatehouse are depicted despite one having been destroyed by this time during Kett's Rebellion. During the English Civil War, Bishop Bridge Gate was again blocked up with earth alongside the St Augustine's and Conisford gates of the city.

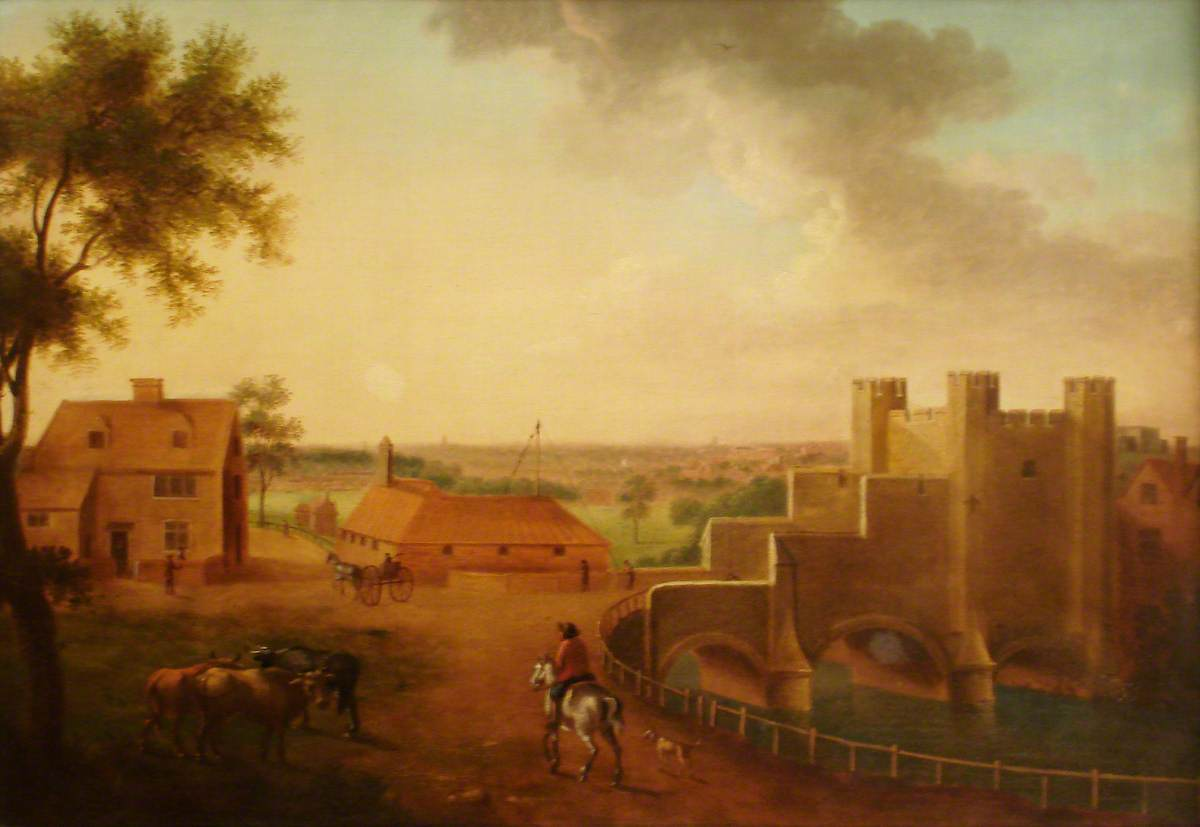
The bridge and gatehouse, painted in circa 1780

By the early 18th century, a sketch by John Kirkpatrick depicted houses adjoining the gate on both its right and left sides. In 1790, the structure underwent an examination, recorded in the Tonnage Books, which determined that the gatehouse had caused serious weakness to the bridge. This involved damage to the first arch which had a large fissure, and the centre arches were also damaged. The entire structure was additionally leaning to the north, with cracks that had previously been secured with iron anchors having reopened. The width of the gate was also an issue. As a result, the gatehouse was demolished in October or November 1791, and the bridge was repaired.

In 1923, the bridge was at risk of demolition; the Norwich Society formed that year, partially in order to halt its destruction. The present design of Fye Bridge, rebuilt in the city in 1933, is based upon Bishop Bridge.

== Architecture ==
The bridge is made of brick, stone and flint, with three segmental arches. Its arches are strengthened with stone ribs that are dressed with brickwork, and stone piers with projecting cutwaters. Its spans vary from 15 feet (4.6 m) to 25 ft (7.6 m). Stone tablets in the parapets display the city arms. A roadway runs over the bridge, wide enough for single-file traffic and footpaths on both sides, though the carriageway may have been wider in the past, with refuges in the parapets being possibly for pedestrians. It features a parapet with a semicircular turn at the west end and a wrought iron lamp standard on the north side.

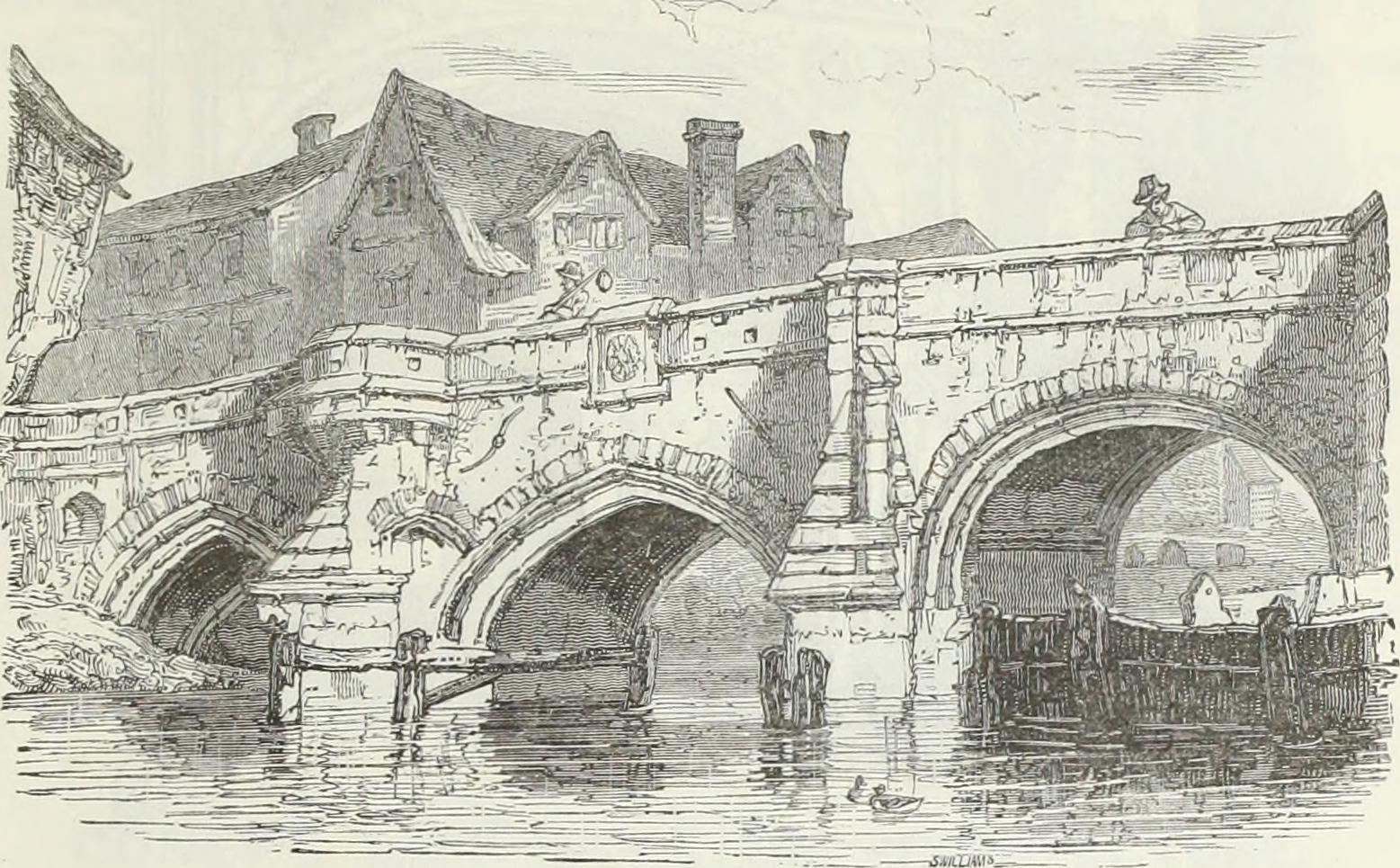
An 1836 engraving of Bishop Bridge by John Britton

The bridge's fortified gatehouse was built on its west end, and extended onto the bridge over two of its arches. It consisted of a single square tower with four octagonal turrets, battlements, and a somewhat ornate mullioned window. High parapet walls on either side of the gate formed a barbican. Its lower section was likely built in ashlar. The gate opening was 9 feet (2.7 m) wide.

== See also ==
- Lollards Pit, place of martyrdom
- Whitefriars Bridge, another bridge in Norwich dating back to the medieval era
- Media related to Bishop's Bridge, Norwich at Wikimedia Commons
