= Whitefriars Bridge =

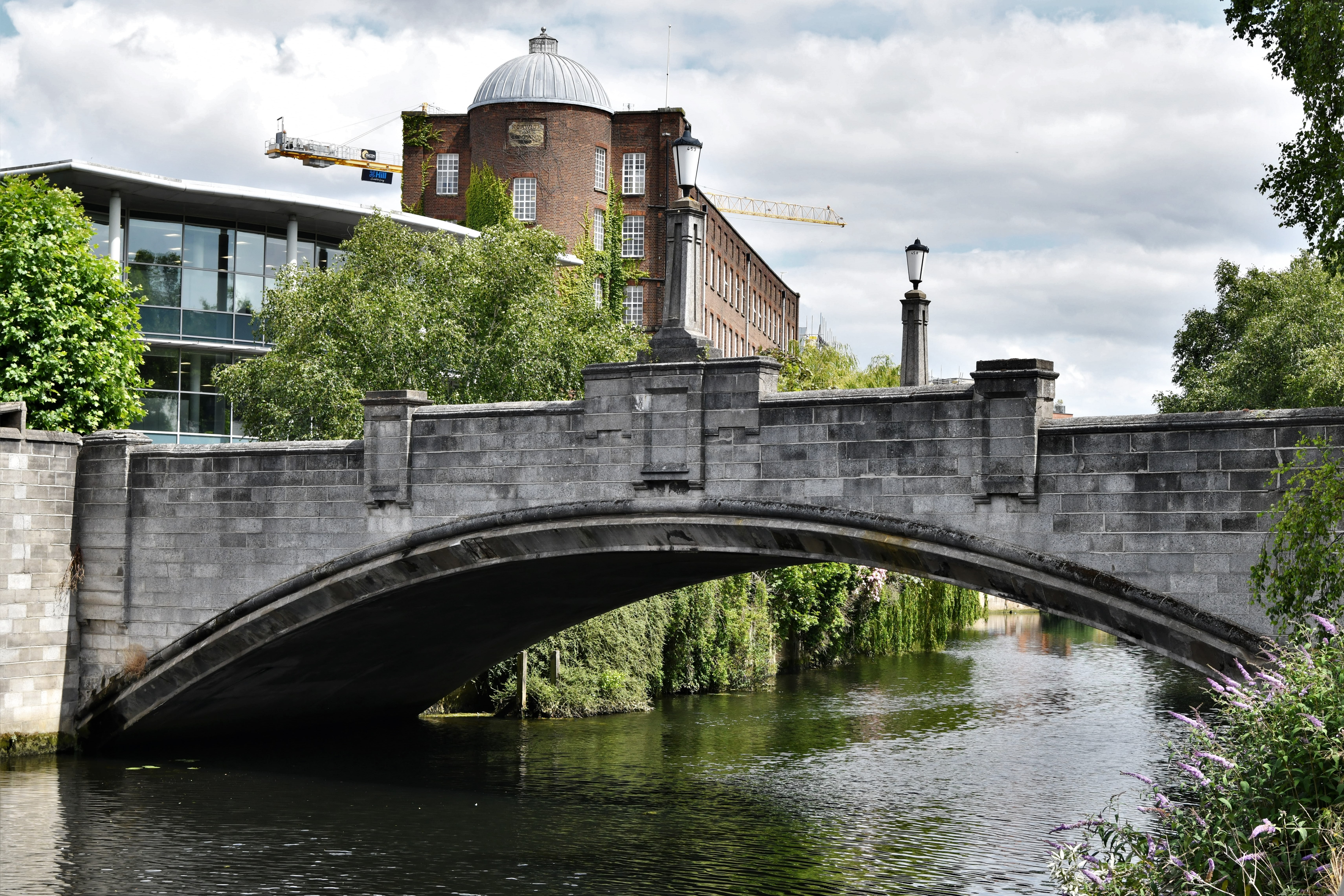
- Whitefriars Bridge in 2023
- Coordinates: 52.63426°N 1.30040°E
- OS grid reference: TG 23429 09170
- Carries: Whitefriars
- Crosses: River Wensum
- Locale: Norwich, England
- Next upstream: Fye Bridge
- Next downstream: Jarrold Bridge

Characteristics
- Material: Stone

History
- Built: 1920s

Location
- Interactive map of Whitefriars Bridge

Whitefriars Bridge, also known as the Bridge of St Martins, is a stone bridge over the River Wensum in Norwich, England, carrying the street Whitefriars.

== History ==
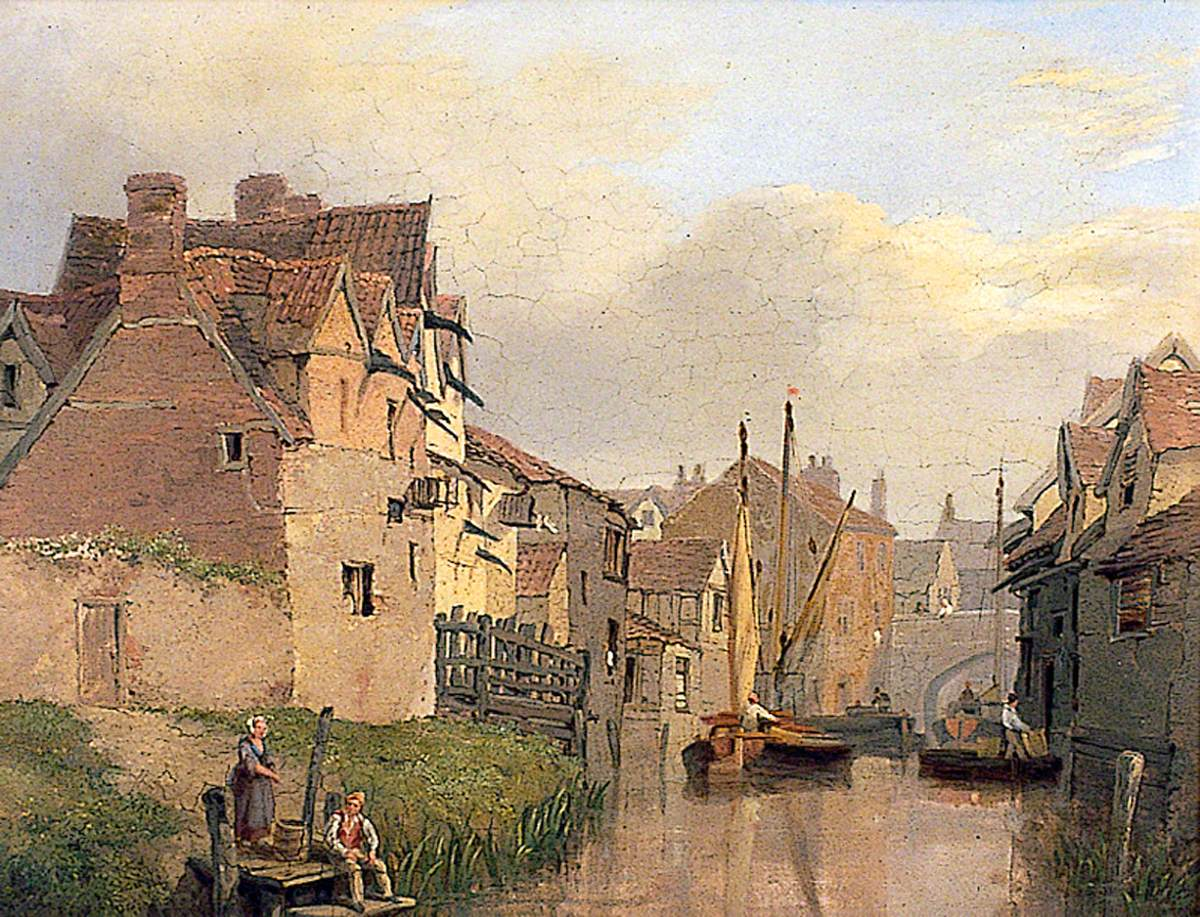
A painting of the Wensum with Whitefriars Bridge in the distance, by Henry Ninham (1793–1874)

The St Martin's Bridge is known to have existed since at least 1106, named after the nearby St Martin at Palace church; as such, it may have been pre-Norman Conquest in origin. During Kett's Rebellion in 1549, John Dudley, Earl of Warwick ordered the destruction of all bridges to Norwich, though later modified the order to include only Whitefriars Bridge; this order was successful, and the bridge was destroyed. This bridge is, however, depicted on William Cuningham's map of Norwich drawn up in 1558.

It was subsequently rebuilt in stone in 1591 with a large arch and two turrets. This was taken down during the reign of James I (1603–1625). The bridge was repaired or altered in 1835. That year, a stone coin mould was dredged from the river close to the bridge, seemingly a 19th-century attempt to duplicate Roman coins.

The bridge was rebuilt in 1924–5 by city engineer A. E. Collins. Aerial photographs of the bridge during World War II depict a road block and a possible above-ground air raid shelter.

== See also ==
- Carrow Bridge, another bridge built in the 1920s in Norwich
- Media related to Whitefriars bridge, Norwich at Wikimedia Commons
