= Pulls Ferry, Norwich =

Disused ferry house in Norwich, England

Pulls Ferry
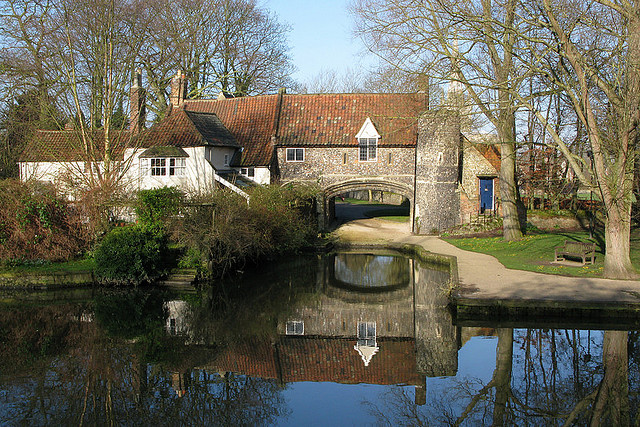
- Water gate and ferry house

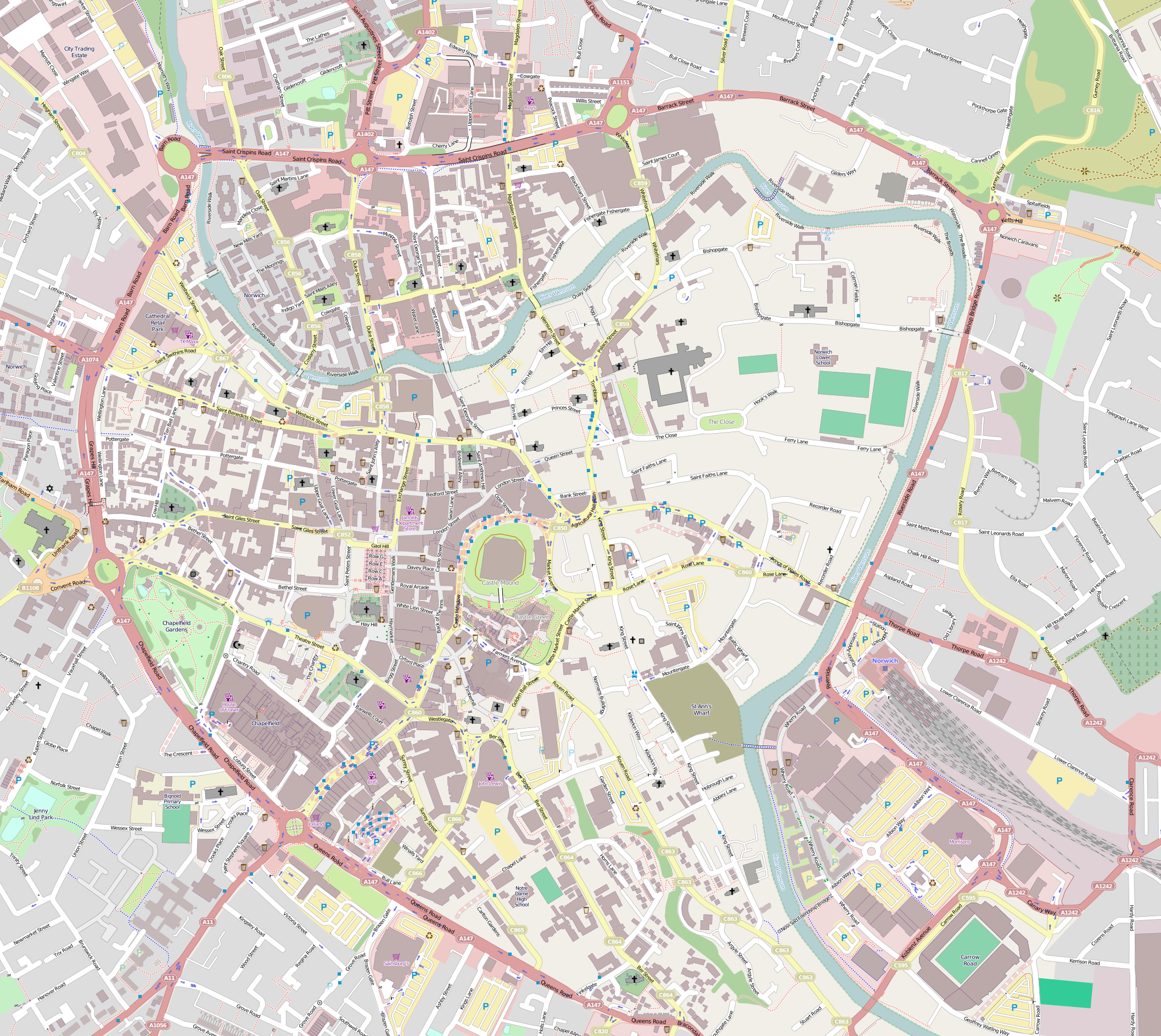
- Location within Norwich Location within Norfolk
- 52°37′49″N 1°18′25″E
- Location: Norwich
- OS grid reference: TG 23897 08758

History
- Built: 15th century

Listed Building – Grade II*
- Official name: Water Gate
- Designated: 12 February 1954
- Reference no.: 1206380

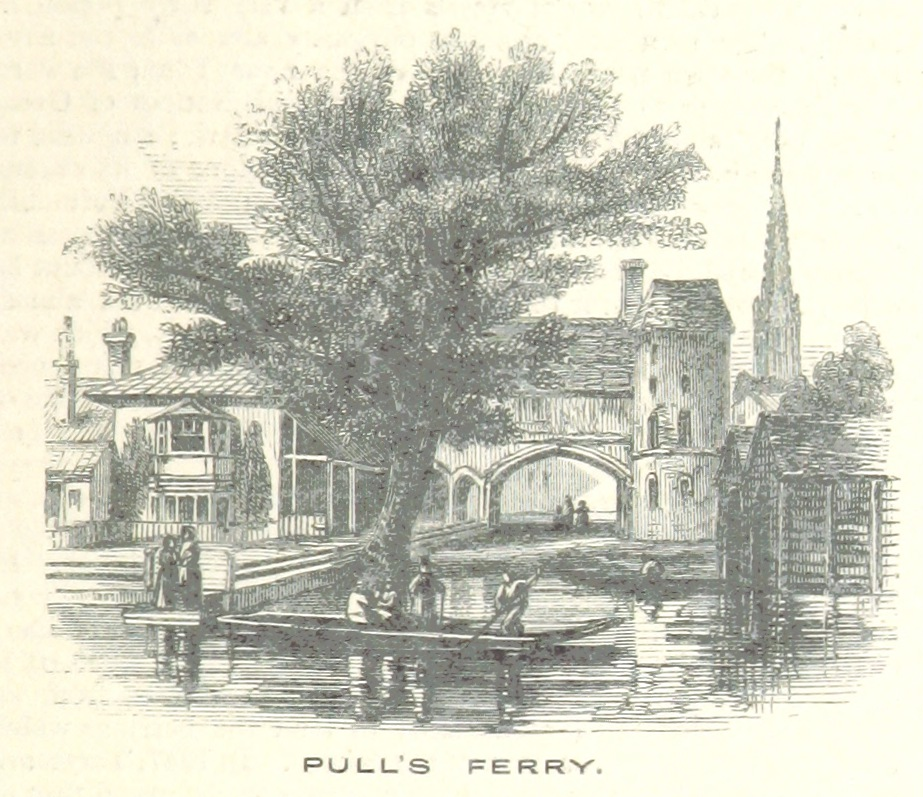
Pulls Ferry depicted in 1851

Pulls Ferry is a former ferry house located on the River Wensum in Norwich, Norfolk, England. It is a flint building and was once a 15th-century watergate. It was the route for the stone used to build Norwich Cathedral. The stone came from Caen up the rivers Yare and Wensum. A canal, specifically built by the monks, used to run under the arch, where the Normans ferried the stone and building materials to be unloaded on the spot.

The building is named after John Pull, who ran the ferry across the Wensum from 1796 to 1841. It was previously known as Sandling's, after a seventeenth-century predecessor. The ferry operated until 1943.

The ferry house adjoining the watergate was built in 1647. Both house and archway were restored in 1948–9 by Cecil Upcher. The building is Grade II* listed.
