= Carrow Bridge =

Bridge in Norwich, England

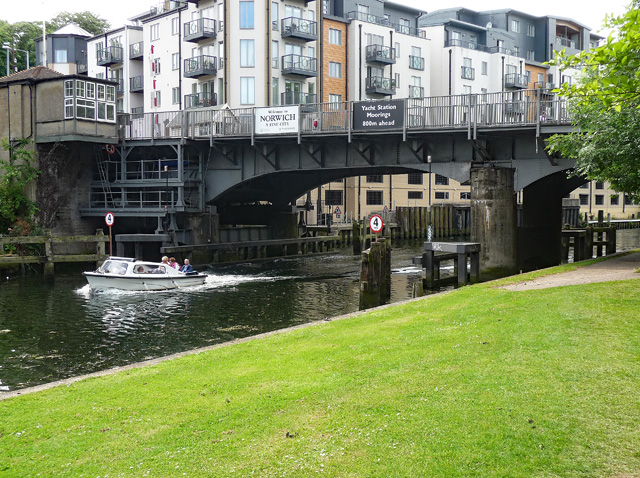
- Carrow Bridge in 2013
- Coordinates: 52.62118°N 1.30644°E
- OS grid reference: TG 2390 0773
- Carries: Carrow Road
- Crosses: River Wensum
- Locale: Norwich, England
- Next upstream: Novi Sad Friendship Bridge
- Next downstream: Trowse Bridge

Characteristics
- Width: 12.5 metres (41 ft)
- Clearance below: 4.27 metres (14.0 ft)

History
- Built: 1923
- Replaces: Old Carrow Bridge

Carrow Bridge is a bridge over the River Wensum in Norwich, England, carrying Carrow Road. The original Old Carrow Bridge was built in 1810 and replaced in 1833 by an iron bascule bridge. A new Carrow Bridge was built further north in 1923 to replace the old one, alongside what is now the only surviving bridge house in the city, Carrow Bridge House.

== History ==
Demand for a larger bridge across the Wensum was present as early as 1776, with the historic crossing points at Trowse Bridge and Bishopgate Bridge providing only limited access to and from the city centre. That year, a letter to the Norwich Corporation asked for an act of Parliament for the building of another bridge. Carrow Bridge was first built in 1810 as a bypass for Foundry Bridge. It was likely made of wood.

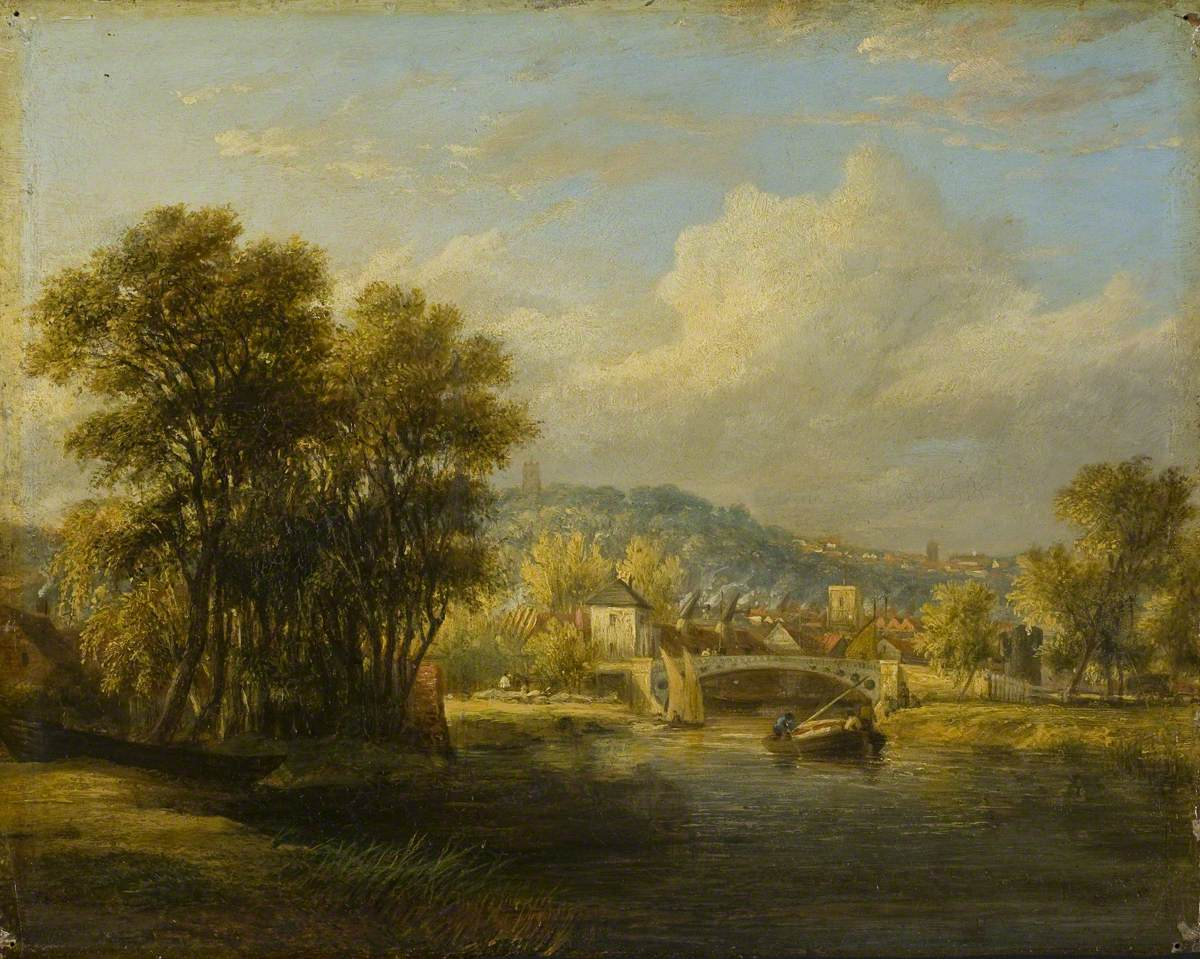
A painting of Carrow Bridge on the Wensum in circa 1834, by James Stark

The 1810 bridge was replaced in 1833 by a single-leaf roller iron bascule bridge, designed by Arthur Browne. It is now known as Old Carrow Bridge.

The current bridge was constructed to replace the old bridge in 1923, in a position further north. This was ostensibly unemployment relief work, due to pressure from Colman's which wanted to extend their works over the public road. Carrow Road was diverted to reach the new bridge.

== Carrow Bridge House ==
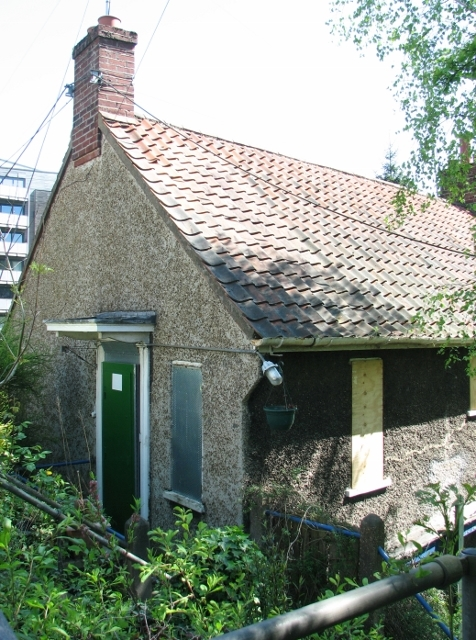
Carrow Bridge House in 2018

Carrow Bridge House, standing next to the current bridge, is the only surviving bridge house in Norwich. The house was built around 1923 to provide accommodation for the bridge master. It is a two-storey cottage with an unusual parallelogram footprint, a pantile roof and pebbledash walls.

Three applications have been made to knock the house down. Norfolk County Council applied to knock it down for landscaping in 2018, and it was sold the following year; its owner of 50 years asked potential buyers to leave it standing. Its new owner Wexham Homes submitted plans to Norwich City Council for it to be demolished and replaced with a new building in 2023 and 2024. All three applications were denied.

== See also ==
- Fye Bridge, another bridge built in the early 20th century in Norwich
- Media related to Carrow Bridge at Wikimedia Commons
