= Blackfriars Bridge, Norwich =

Bridge in Norwich, England

Blackfriars Bridge
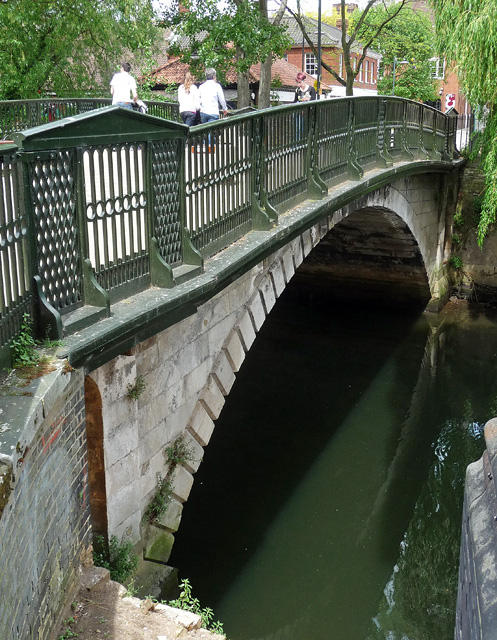
- Blackfriars Bridge in 2013
- Coordinates: 52.63183°N 1.29484°E
- OS grid reference: TG 23065 08882
- Carries: St George's Street
- Crosses: River Wensum
- Locale: Norwich, England
- Next upstream: Duke's Palace Bridge
- Next downstream: Fye Bridge

Characteristics
- Material: Stone and iron

History
- Designer: John Soane
- Constructed by: John de Carle
- Built: 1783–4

Statistics

Listed Building – Grade II
- Designated: 26 February 1954
- Reference no.: 1372480

Location
- Interactive map of Blackfriars Bridge

Blackfriars Bridge, also known as St George's Bridge, is a grade II listed stone and iron single-arched bridge over the River Wensum in Norwich, England, carrying St George's Street. A bridge at the site has existed from the 13th century. It was replaced during Edward IV's reign, then again in 1589, and for a final time by John Soane in 1784.

== History ==
Blackfriars Bridge takes its name from the Dominican monks who established an extensive monastery in the area in the 13th century, and built a timber bridge across the Wensum. During the reign of Edward IV, the bridge was rebuilt. This bridge is depicted on William Cuningham's map of Norwich drawn up in 1558. In an assembly meeting held on 16 November 1562 it was noted that the New Mills and Blackfriars Bridge were 'in decay and required moche costes'. It was replaced again in 1589 by a stone bridge with three spans.

As a result of a need to improve the link of industrial Norwich-over-the-Water with the city centre, the current bridge was designed by Sir John Soane, and built in 1783–4 by stonemason of Norwich John de Carle. It was later widened. The Ordnance Survey map describes the bridge as St. George's Bridge.

== Architecture ==
The bridge features a single rusticated Portland stone arch, with voussoirs and coved niches, spanning 44 ft 6 in. It features simple cast iron railings, with balustrades at the ends that have lattice panels and pedimented sections. The section of St George's Street that crosses the bridge is narrow at 10 ft wide, and its footpaths are supported on cantilevered iron ribs that carry the balustrades. On the west parapet is a hose spout.

== See also ==
- Foundry Bridge, Norwich, another stone and iron bridge in Norwich
- Media related to Blackfriar's Bridge, Norwich at Wikimedia Commons
