= Fye Bridge =

Bridge in Norwich, England

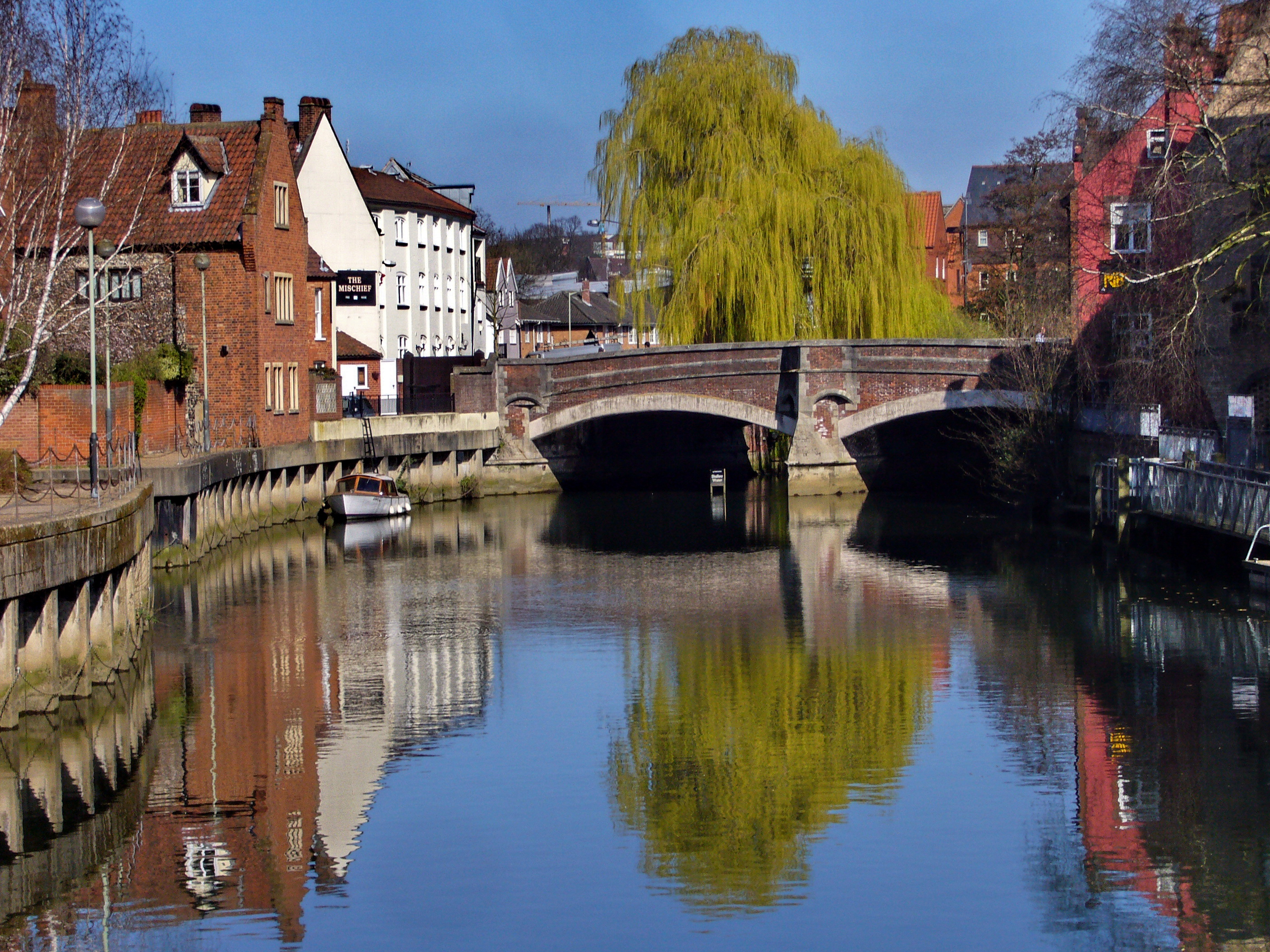
- Fye Bridge in 2011
- Coordinates: 52.632909°N 1.297218°E
- OS grid reference: TG 23221 09010
- Carries: Fye Bridge Street
- Crosses: River Wensum
- Locale: Norwich, England
- Next upstream: Blackfriars Bridge
- Next downstream: Whitefriars Bridge

Characteristics
- Material: Brick and stone

History
- Built: 1933

Statistics

Listed Building – Grade II
- Designated: 5 June 1972
- Reference no.: 1025090

Location
- Interactive map of Fye Bridge

Fye Bridge is a grade II listed brick and stone double-arched bridge over the River Wensum in Norwich, England, carrying Fye Bridge Street, and at the end of Wensum Street. It is a historically important thoroughfare, connecting the north and south of the city, and is likely the oldest surviving bridge site in Norwich, Bishop Bridge being the oldest one still standing in the city.

The bridge likely began in the mid-10th century as a timber causeway, though actual documentary references to the site date back to 1141. A stone bridge was built on the site around 1400 and then rebuilt in 1573. It was the site of the market cross known as Stump Cross, a pillory and a ducking stool in the 17th century. Fye Bridge was replaced with an iron bridge in 1829, and then again in 1933 with the current brick bridge.

== History ==
There is evidence of a timber causeway at the site, which likely dates back to the mid-10th century. There is also evidence of a mid-channel bar on the riverbed which would have assisted the construction of such a crossing. At this time, the crossing was on the principal north-to-south route through Tombland and past St Clement's church, suggesting that the crossing was of early importance. The crossing was protected on both sides by enclosed settlements. The ground was a peaty bog with gravel, and as such the roadway leading to the causeway, extending north to Fishergate and south to Elm Hill, was planked during this period. The first reference to a bridge on this site is in 1141, and the earliest record of a bridge there dates back to 1283. The bridge remained as timber over the medieval period.

In about 1400 a two-arched stone bridge was built. This bridge is depicted on William Cuningham's map of Norwich drawn up in 1558. It suffered flood damage and was rebuilt in 1573.

During the 17th century, Fye Bridge was the main thoroughfare linking northern and southern Norwich across the river, and was adjacent to the fish market, bringing high footfall. Next to the pillory at Fye Bridge was one of two ducking stools that are known to have existed in the city, the other being Jack's Pit. On a "‘sabbothe daye morninge" in 1600, Norwich servant Prudence Murrell saw John Buckingham "and two fellowes" pick up the Fye Bridge ducking stool and throw it into the river. Margaret Crookhill, who had called Merable Church a witch and had narrowly avoided the cage in 1628, was threatened with a ducking at this stool if more complaints were made against her. On the bridge was situated a stone market cross known as Stump Cross, until it was demolished in 1644. Another woman, Mary Clay, was ducked three times there in 1670. The west side of the bridge featured a fortified gate until 1791.

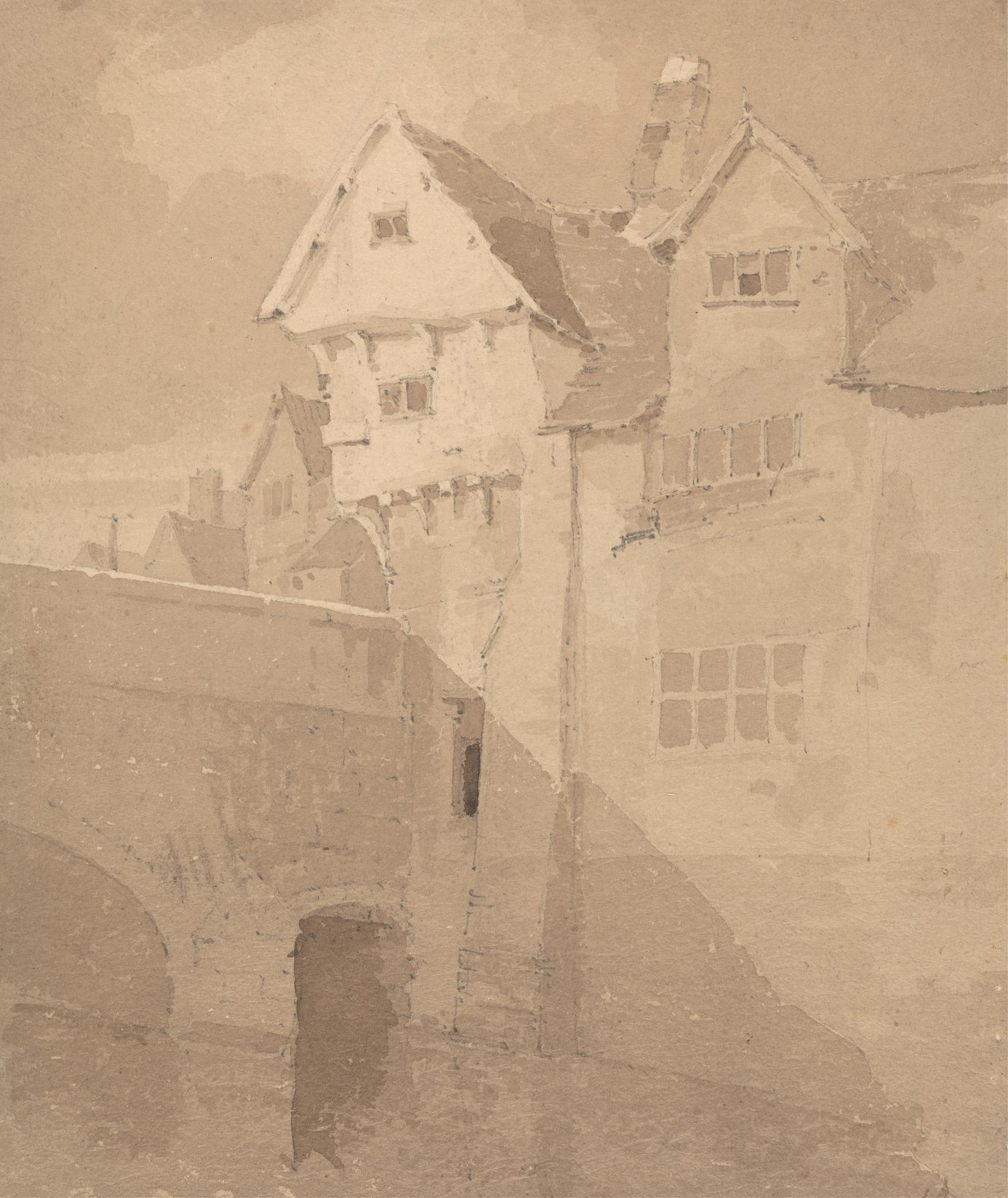
A drawing of the stone Fye Bridge by John Thirtle (1777–1839)

In 1820 for the proclamation of George IV, the procession crossed the bridge. County Surveyor Francis Stone designed an iron bridge for the location, which replaced the previous bridge in 1829. This bridge saw the procession for the proclamation of William IV in 1830. This bridge was widened in 1921 or 1929.

In 1933, the current bridge was built, along the lines of the original medieval bridge. It features two flat segmental stone arches that each span 35 feet (11 m), which support brick spandrels and parapets. Its design is based on Bishop Bridge, the only surviving medieval bridge in the city.

== See also ==
- Carrow Bridge, another bridge built in the early 20th century in Norwich
- Media related to Fye Bridge, Norwich at Wikimedia Commons
