= Whissonsett =

Village in Norfolk, England

Coordinates: 52.77639°N 0.84526°E

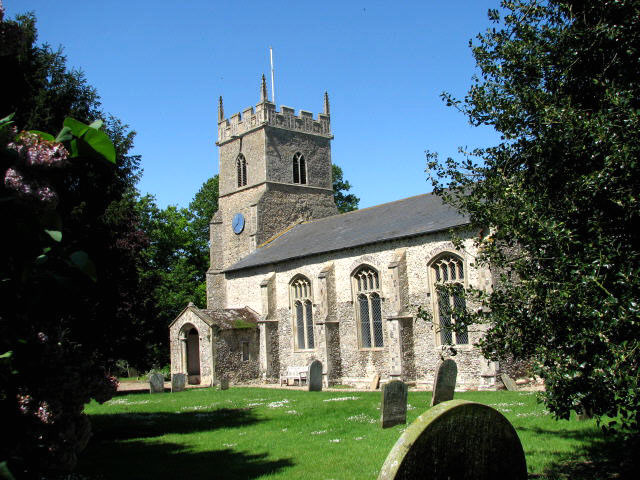
- St Mary's church, Whissonsett

- Location within Norfolk
- Area: 5.57 km^{2} (2.15 sq mi)
- Population: 488 (2011 census)
  - Density: 88/km^{2} (230/sq mi)
- OS grid reference: TF916230
  - London: 112 miles (180 km)
- Civil parish: Whissonsett CP
- District: Breckland
- Shire county: Norfolk
- Region: East
- Country: England
- Sovereign state: United Kingdom
- Post town: DEREHAM
- Postcode district: NR20
- Dialling code: 01328
- Police: Norfolk
- Fire: Norfolk
- Ambulance: East of England
- UK Parliament: North Norfolk
- Website: http://www.whissonsett.com

Whissonsett is a village and a civil parish in the English county of Norfolk. The village is 5.0 miles (8.0 km) south of Fakenham, 23 miles (37 km) west-north-west of Norwich and 112 miles (180 km) north-north-east of London. The nearest railway station is at King's Lynn for the Fen Line which runs between King's Lynn and Cambridge. The nearest airport is Norwich International Airport. The parish had in 2001 census, a population of 483 in 206 households, increasing to a population of 488 in 209 households at the 2011 Census. For the purposes of local government, the parish falls within the district of Breckland. The village lies close to the source of the River Wensum.

== History ==
The name Whissonsett is thought to derive from Witcingkeseta as it has been known as in the past and means either the settlement of the Witcing tribe or a place of watery meadows.

=== Domesday Book ===
Whissonsett has an entry in the Domesday Book of 1085. In the great book Whissonsett is recorded by the names Witcingkeseta. The main landholders being Roger Bigod with the main tenant being Ranulf Fitz Walter. The survey also mentions seven Beehives and ¼ of a Fishery. In the Domesday survey fractions were used to indicate that the entry, in this case the fishery, was on an estate that lay within more than one parish.

== Saint Mary's parish church ==
Saint Mary's parish church was built mainly during the Early English period (cica 1250) and is constructed from flint with freestone dressing. The church has undergone considerable restoration over the past centuries.

One of the features of Saint Mary's are the large image niches, one in the nave and two in the chancel, either side of the east window. The one in the nave contains the large head of an Anglo-Saxon cross, unearthed in the graveyard by grave diggers in 1902.
