= PS Telegraph explosion =

1817 steamboat explosion in Norwich, England

- Date: 4 April 1817
- Time: 9 am
- Location: Downstream from Foundry Bridge, Norwich, England
- Cause: Boiler explosion
- Deaths: 10 (9 instant, 1 from injuries)
- Injuries: 5

At about 9 am on 4 April 1817, the boiler of the PS Telegraph, an early steamboat, exploded after it set off from Foundry Bridge in the city centre of Norwich, England. The Telegraph, a naval prize later fitted with a steam engine, was part of a barge from Norwich to the town of Great Yarmouth owned by the Quaker brothers John and Richard Wright. Of the 22 people on board, nine were killed instantly, including five men, three women, and one two-year-old boy. One of those killed was steersman William Nickerson. Six women were injured, some with bone fractures leading to amputations, and one of these six later died from her injuries. The incident was the first boiler explosion in a steamboat in Britain.

The incident prompted local and national media publicity within days of its occurrence, and a relief fund raised over £400. The survivors were also compensated £10,000 by the Wrights, who halted their work with steam engines. After an initial local investigation by a special Court of Mayoralty, a Parliamentary select committee was established the same year, the first official investigation into a steamboat accident in Britain. It found that the explosion was caused by defects in the boiler's construction (it had been partially fixed with cast iron) and reckless practice by the unknown individual manning its safety valve. The investigation led its chairman Charles Harvey MP to create a bill regulating steamboats' registration, construction and inspection. The bill was never passed into law due to the prorogation of Parliament on two separate occasions, despite general support. Many of the select committee's recommendations were voluntarily put into practice by steamboat owners to reassure their customers. After further incidents and investigations, legal regulations came into effect many years later.

== Background ==
In the early 19th century, Britain was undergoing the Industrial Revolution, a significant transformation that particularly concerned the relationship between the general public and new technologies. These technologies included a new means of travel by the way of steamboats; the first commercial steamboat service had been established by Henry Bell on the River Clyde in 1812. The attitude at the time to regulation was laissez-faire.

=== John and Richard Wright ===
The Quaker brothers John and Richard Wright of Great Yarmouth were early experimenters from 1811 or 1812 in attempting to create "an engine worked by the explosive force of hydrogen mixed with air". They conducted their experiments on a former French privateer row-boat or lugger which was most likely the ship La Vigilante captured in 1811, though may have been one of two boats named L'Actif, captured in 1808 and 1809. After the Wrights had spent much time failing to work with hydrogen, that boat was instead given a Trevithick three horsepower high-pressure steam engine in June 1813. Making its first voyage from the Humber estuary, during which the boat was temporarily driven ashore on the North Lincolnshire coast and lost its insurance, it arrived in Yarmouth on 19 July 1813 and was here renamed the PS Experiment.

==== Barge from Norwich to Great Yarmouth ====
On 12 August 1813, the Wrights made use of the Experiment by beginning a regular steam barge service on the River Yare between the city of Norwich and the town of Yarmouth. John was known to cover the financial side of the business, whereas Richard was technical and worked on the boats. The barge was known to travel the 30 miles (48 km) downstream, from Norwich to Yarmouth, in less than 3.5 hours.

=== PS Telegraph ===
The PS Telegraph was the second steamboat run by Richard Wright following the Experiment. It was 20 tons with 3 horsepower. The Telegraph was likely an ex-naval prize, taken on an unknown date by HMS Blazer and described as "formerly a Lugger name unknown" before being condemned as a prize in the High Court of the Admiralty of England on 6 July 1813. It was initially put to work as part of the Norwich-Yarmouth barge, working in concert with the Experiment for a few months at the end of 1813 before the Experiment disappeared and then operating alongside the Wrights' third steamboat, the steam packet PS Courier, which likely took on the Experiment's engine. The Telegraph was eventually registered in 1816 as a "two-masted square-sterned clench-built barge," of 55 feet 5 inches (16.89 m) in length, 11 feet 3 inches (3.43 m) in width, and 6 feet (1.8 m) in height, "with a raised cabin fore and aft, false gangways and fitted with a stern engine".

Richard Wright tested the Telegraph for a few weeks running between Sheerness and Chatham in the River Medway, and it was claimed that this was the first coastal voyage of a British steamship "to sea", though it is unclear how much of this journey was made with steam power. Richard Wright after a few weeks found its engine lacked enough power and so brought it back to Yarmouth. Here, it was found that the salt water that had been used in the boiler had damaged it; a new cast-iron end was bolted onto the Telegraph's old wrought-iron boiler during repairs.

== Explosion ==
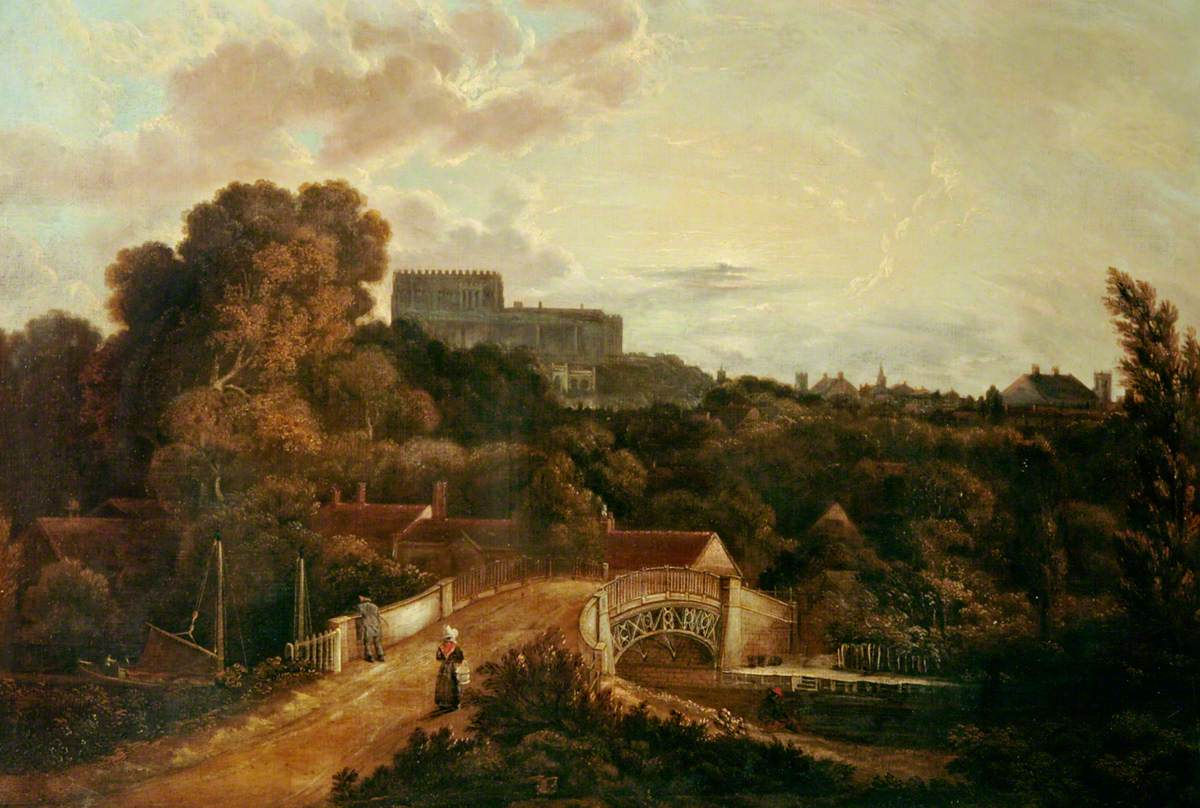
Foundry Bridge (from which the Telegraph set off) as it was in 1817, painted by Robert Ladbrooke in c. 1822–1833.

At about 9 am on 4 April 1817, Good Friday, the Telegraph was setting out on its voyage from Norwich to Yarmouth. There were 22 people on board, including three young children, two of whom were infants. Steered by one William Nickerson, the boat had just started from Foundry Bridge, in the city centre of Norwich, and was opposite the residence of one Mr Aggs. Here, the boiler of the steamboat's engine exploded. The Norfolk Chronicle and Norwich Gazette described the explosion making a "tremendous noise", and claimed that "by the irresistible force of the explosion, the vessel was literally blown to atoms." The incident marked the first boiler explosion in a steamboat in Britain.

The explosion caused nine instantaneous deaths, as well as six injuries. While the immediate deaths were initially reported as eight (five men including steersman William Nickerson, and three women), the body of a two-year-old boy would later be found in the river. Those killed were mostly from Yarmouth and Norwich. One of the men killed, aside from Nickerson, was reported as wearing "sailors dress", and may have been another crewmember. Among others, Mr Aggs was noted by the Norfolk Chronicle for giving prompt assistance to the survivors. Those who escaped the blast were three young children and four men who included the engineer, named Digeens (or Digcens), as well as the steward of the Telegraph, James Cammel.

One of the surviving infants lost both parents in the explosion. All of the six injured were women whose names are known, and many of them were severely incapacitated. They included 50-year-old Esther Walton of Yarmouth, whose leg was badly fractured in the blast and later amputated, as well as 36-year-old Mary Stephen, also of Yarmouth, who had compound fractures and lost both of her legs. Of the six injured, a further individual died as a result of her injuries, bringing the total fatalities to 10.

== Responses ==
A report of the incident was published on 5 April, the next day, by the Norfolk Chronicle. The incident had a novel nature due to its violent character, location in Norwich's city centre, and its impact on the passengers. This led to national publicity concerning the explosion; Within three days of the incident, there was national press coverage in The Times and the Morning Chronicle. They looked to elicit horror as well as sympathy for the victims. The Times was particularly explicit in its coverage, writing that "seven persons had almost every limb broken" and referring to "the horrible spectacle of eight mangled carcasses." From 10 to 19 April, press coverage expanded to local papers across the United Kingdom, including the Caledonian Mercury, the Leeds Mercury, the Derby Mercury and the Hull Packet. The Caledonian Mercury wrote that of the passengers, "the whole were thrown in different directions, and to a considerable distance."

A group of respected engineers including Bryan Donkin (1768–1855), Timothy Bramah (1784–1838), and John Collinge, all members of the London Society of Practical Engineers, travelled to Norwich to see the aftermath. On Wednesday 9 April, local magistrates held a special Court of Mayoralty in an effort to investigate the explosion, hearing the opinions of several of these respected engineers from London. The Norfolk Chronicle's next issue on Saturday 12 April reported that a coroner's inquest had taken place, and that the juror's verdict for the nine fatalities was "Accidental Death". An "Appeal to Public Generosity", in other words a relief fund, was set up to support those affected. By mid-June, the fund was at a substantial sum of over £400. Its distribution was supervised by three local women; Mrs Lubbock, Mrs Unthank, and Miss Aggs.

The Wrights paid the relatives of the survivors compensation totalling to some £10,000, which was an enormous amount at the time. They stopped using steam propulsion after the incident. They converted the Courier and ran it as a horse-packet for some time before selling it to Yarmouth plumbing firm Tuck & Fisher, who years later converted it back into a steamboat themselves.

=== Select Committee ===
Charles Harvey, Member of Parliament for Norwich from 1812 to 1818, raised the matter of the Norwich explosion in the House of Commons on 8 May 1817, and proposed a select committee to consider the "means of preventing the mischief of explosions." Following support from fellow MPs, the "Select Committee Appointed to Consider of the Means of Preventing the Mischief of Explosions from Happening On Board Steam Boats" was appointed, with Harvey as its chairman, to discuss the explosion. It began hearing evidence on 13 May 1817. It was the first official investigation into steamboat accidents in Britain, and as argued by John Armstrong and David Williams, was "arguably the first occasion when government addressed the question of whether [...] it had a duty to intervene to protect the general public or whether it should stand back and allow market forces to operate freely."

The select committee took evidence on seven days between 13 May and 7 June. Of the 23 witnesses, 19 described themselves as engineers. These included Henry Maudslay (1771–1831), Donkin and Bramah, the latter of whom was a specialist in hot water heating and owned a company that provided steam engines. As a whole, these individuals and more had a diversity of engineering skills, and worked as inventors, business creators and managers. There were also engineers George Dodd, Josias Jessop and Alexander Nimmo. Other engineers included Robert Robertson who had been the engineer of the PS Comet in 1812, and Alexander Annan, both of whom had been trained in family business. One of the witnesses was named Richard Wright, though he contributed little and may not have been the same Richard Wright as the co-owner of the barge. Most of the engineers were from London, though three were from the steam engine-focused mining industry in Cornwall and two others were from Newcastle and Birmingham. Two other witnesses were manufacturing chemists, and two more did not have a scientific background; Seth Hunt, an American citizen from Louisiana, and John Richter, a sugar refiner who knew of the Whitechapel refinery boiler explosion.

==== Report and recommendations ====
The committee produced its report and recommendations on 24 June 1817. With a focus on the technological aspects of what caused the explosion, the committee came to the conclusion that the causes of the explosion were defects in the boiler's construction as well as reckless practice by whoever was manning the safety valve. These included the fact that the boiler was made of two materials with most of it being of wrought iron and the end being of cast iron, the latter being an inferior material that caused boilers to explode suddenly if they collapsed. The boiler had also been working at a very high pressure for the time; according to Donkin, at 30 psi or more and according to Bramah, at 60. They remarked that there was only one safety valve on the boiler, and Harvey in particular blamed part of the incident on "the obstinacy of a person who persisted in loading the safety valve." Evidence was put forward that this unnamed individual ignored warning signs and may have held down the valve so as to increase the boat's speed.

The committee recommended regulations upon boiler materials, engine pressure and operating practices, despite the political mood supporting non-intervention by government at the time. The beginning of the report's opening statement, largely in support of laissez-faire economics, reads as such:

Your Committee entered on the task assigned them, with a strong feeling of the inexpediency of legislative interference with the management of private concerns or property: further than the public safety should demand, and more especially with the exertions of that mechanical skill and ingenuity, in which the artists of this country are so pre-eminent, by which the labour of man has been greatly abridged, the manufactures of the country carried to an unrivalled perfection, and its commerce extended over the whole world. Amongst these, it is impossible for a moment to overlook the introduction of Steam as a most powerful agent, of almost universal application, and of such utility, that but for its assistance, a very large portion of the workmen employed in an extensive mineral district of this kingdom, would be deprived of their subsistence. A reference to the Evidence taken before Your Committee, will, also show with what advantage this power has lately been applied, in Great Britain, to propel vessels both of burthen and passage, how much more extensively it has been used in America, and of what farther application it is certainly capable, if it be said to be even now anticipated in prospect. Such considerations have rendered Your Committee, still more adverse than when they entered on the inquiry, to propose to the House the adoption of any legislative measure, by which the science and ingenuity of our artists might even appear to be fettered or discouraged.

It also added a caveat in support of intervention by Parliament, arguing that public safety was worth government interference if freedom was misused or if individuals in the public lacked the power or knowledge for their self-protection:

they [the Committee] apprehend that a consideration of what is due to public safety, has on several occasions established the principle, that where that safety may be endangered by ignorance, avarice or inattention, against which individuals are unable either from the want of knowledge, or the power to protect themselves, it becomes the duty of Parliament to interfere.

Based on the idea that the passengers could not have known of the issues with the boiler, the committee put forward a selection of "simple and easy" recommendations and reforms; for all steamboats hired to carry passengers to be registered at their home ports, for all boilers on steamboats to be constructed of wrought iron or copper, for all of these boilers to be inspected by a skilled engineer before they carried passengers, for all of these boilers to have two safety valves with one inaccessible to the person running the engine, for inspectors to determine the maximum pressure allowed in the boiler and the maximum working pressure for opening the valve (with the latter not being larger than one third of the former), and for the imposition of a £50 penalty for the contravention of regulations on boiler pressure.

=== Bill ===
Alongside the introduction of the report to the House of Commons on 7 July 1817, Harvey proposed and read a bill in Parliament that promised to take forward the committee's regulations. The bill would have particularly introduced a requirement for safety valves to be fitted to boilers and for steamboats to be registered and receive regular inspection. On 8 July, the bill had a second reading and was subject to minor amendments. This bill was not passed as law as it ran into problems concerning the end of the parliamentary session; Parliament was prorogued only four days after the second reading.

Upon the reconvention of Parliament, Harvey reintroduced the bill; it was read on 4 February 1818, had its second reading on 2 March, and on 22 April was considered in committee with a few minor amendments again being made. There was a singular opposing voice of one Mr Finlay when it was taken back to the House; he "condemned the spirit" of the legislation and stated that the matters were better left to the concerned parties. He proposed a reconsideration of the bill, which prompted a third reading on 15 May. Additionally, Harvey received an order to bring the bill to the House of Lords which he did the same day. Parliament was dissolved on 10 June 1818, and after Harvey switched constituencies in the new Parliament the bill was not proposed again.

While John Armstrong and David Williams have argued that the bill failed "through the forces of unfortunate circumstance", they have also said that the Norwich explosion was seen at the time as singular and isolated, and there was not yet a formal record of this form of accident. While no regulation came into force, many of the recommendations were put in place by steamboat owners on a voluntary basis due to their interest in customer reassurance. Advertisements for steamboats such as the Prince of Coburg and the London Engineer emphasised the safety of their services that year. Sterner regulations on steamboats began to take effect many years later, after further investigations into other incidents were carried out.

In 1839, a "Report on Steam Vessel Accidents" listed and classified these accidents as the result of a parliamentary enquiry. It listed the 1817 Norwich explosion as "the first in our schedule of accidents as a case of explosion", and "the first which occurred in this country on board a steamboat".

== Sources ==
- Armstrong, John; Williams, David M. (1 January 2011). "The "Norwich Explosion" of 1817: A Local Tragedy of National Significance". The Impact of Technological Change: The Early Steamship in Britain. Liverpool University Press. pp. 245–258. doi:10.5949/liverpool/9780986497377.003.0013. ISBN 9781786944474.

== See also ==
- The Great Blow – another explosion in Norwich
- PS Jan van Arkel II – a steamboat which exploded with similar fatalities
