= St Crispin's Bridge =

Bridge in Norwich, England

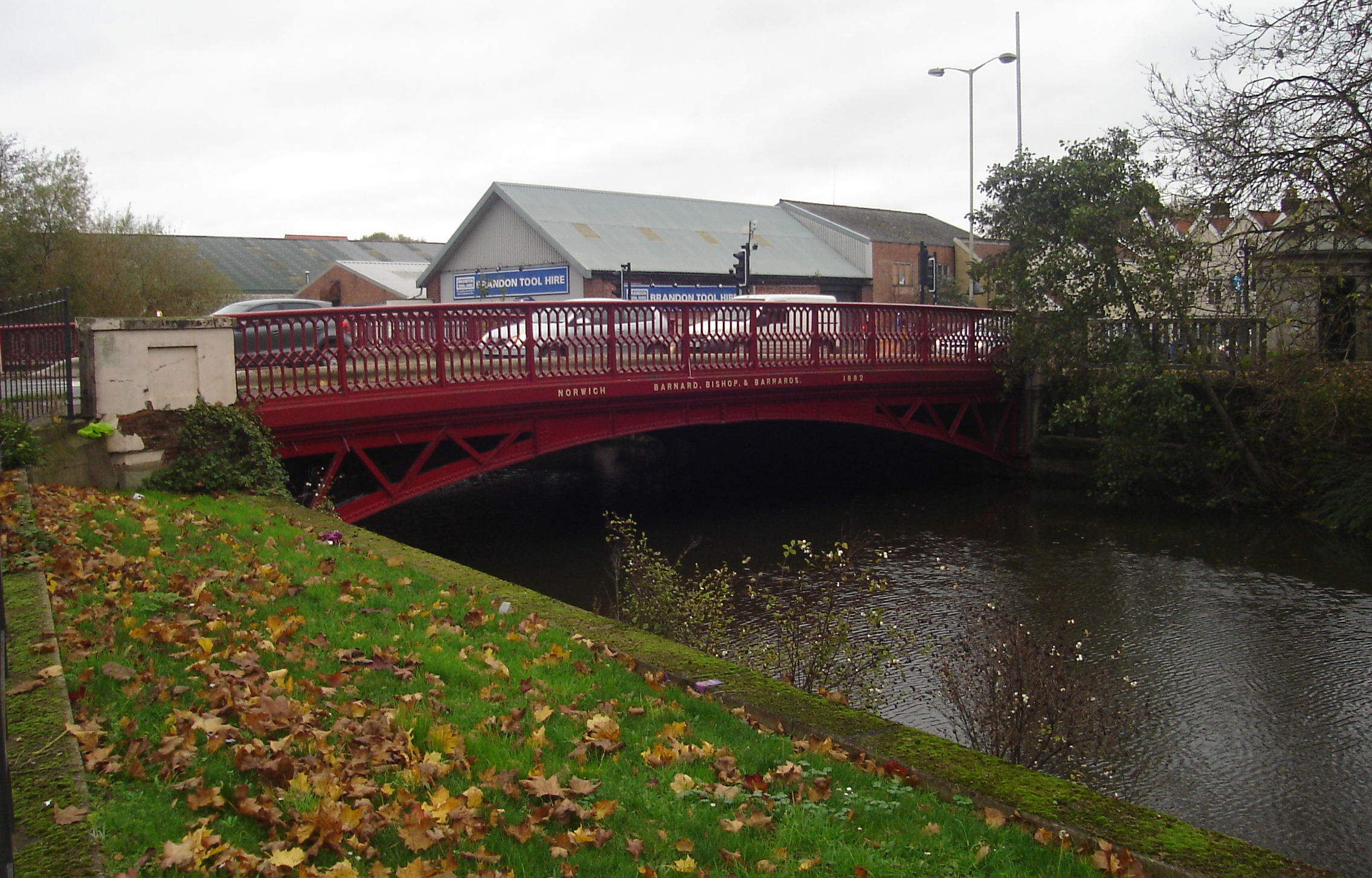
- St Crispin's Bridge in 2015
- Coordinates: 52.63531°N 1.28820°E
- OS grid reference: TG 22598 09249
- Carries: St Crispin's Road
- Crosses: River Wensum
- Locale: Norwich, England
- Other name(s): Station Bridge
- Next upstream: St Crispin's Road bridge
- Next downstream: New Mills

Characteristics
- Material: Cast iron, steel

History
- Constructed by: Barnard, Bishop & Barnards
- Built: 1882

Statistics

Listed Building – Grade II
- Designated: 5 June 1972
- Reference no.: 1051868

St Crispin's Bridge, formerly known as Station Bridge, is a grade II listed wrought iron arch bridge over the River Wensum in Norwich, England, carrying St Crispin's Road.

The bridge was constructed in 1882 by Barnard, Bishop & Barnard. Its opening took place the same year as the opening of the nearby Norwich City railway station, after which it was originally named. City Station closed in 1969. It is next to what is now the Barn Road roundabout, and serves the south carriageway of the Norwich ring road; in the 1970s, a pre-cast concrete companion bridge was constructed immediately north of the bridge.

The bridge has a flat-arched wrought iron span of 55 ft (17 m) with latticed spandrels, and is 26 ft (8 m) wide. It features riveted steel girders with a cast iron lattice balustrade. The words "Norwich Barnard, Bishop & Barnards 1882", are displayed on the parapet plinth.

== See also ==
- St Miles Bridge, a cast iron bridge in Norwich
