= River Wensum =

River in Norfolk, England

Wensum
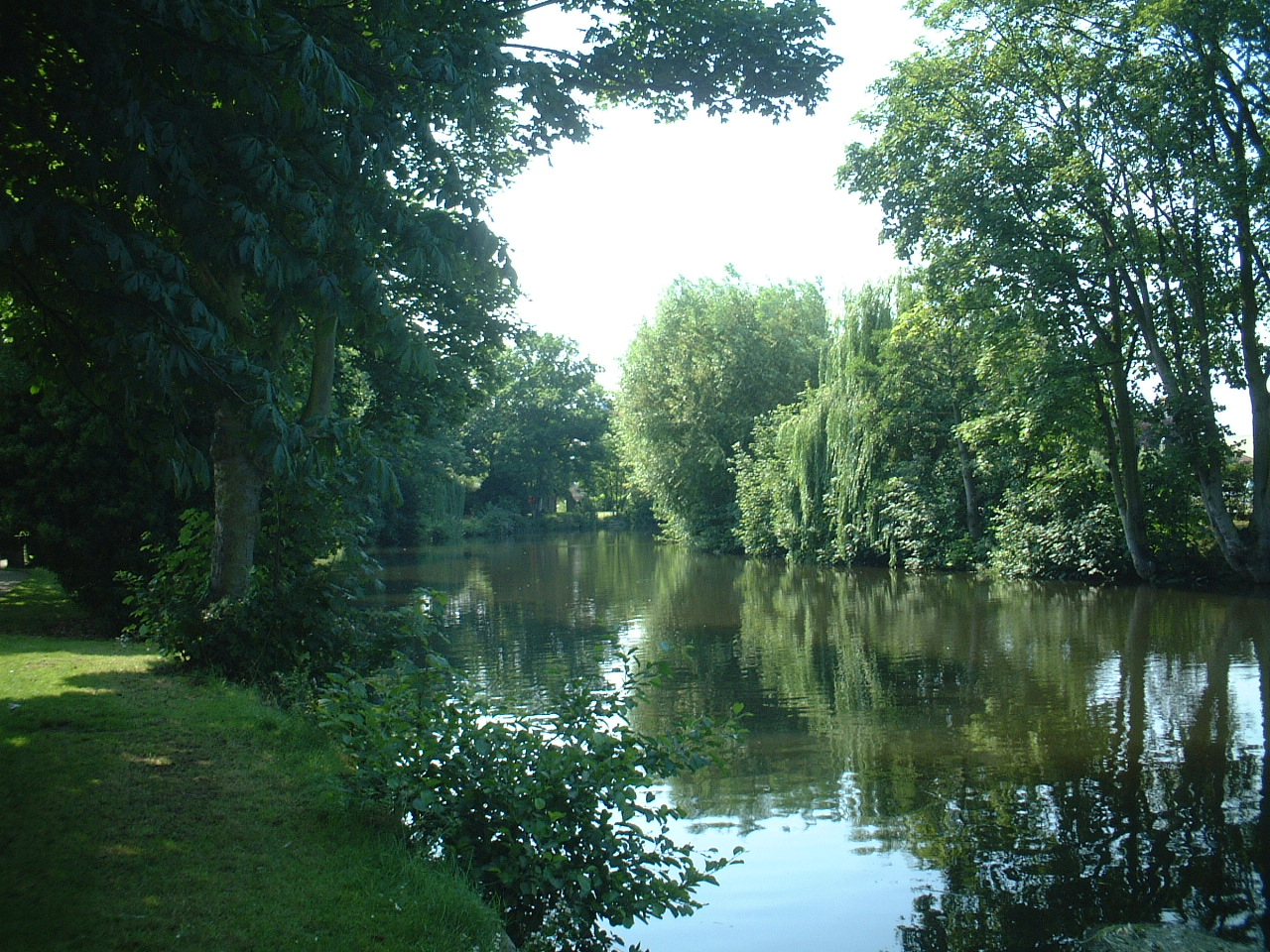
- The River Wensum in Norwich

Location
- Country: England
- Counties: Norfolk

Physical characteristics
- Source
  - location: Whissonsett, Norfolk
  - coordinates: 52.7917°N 0.8464°E
- Mouth: River Yare
  - location: Whitlingham, Norwich
  - coordinates: 52.6213°N 1.3230°E
- Discharge
  - location: Costessey Mill
  - average: 4.05 m^{3}/s (143 cu ft/s)
  - minimum: 0.36 m^{3}/s (13 cu ft/s) 6 August 1991
  - maximum: 34.0 m^{3}/s (1,200 cu ft/s) 29 January 1984
- Discharge
  - location: Swanton Morley
  - average: 2.76 m^{3}/s (97 cu ft/s)
- Discharge
  - location: Fakenham
  - average: 0.87 m^{3}/s (31 cu ft/s)

The River Wensum is a chalk river in Norfolk, England and a tributary of the River Yare, despite being the larger of the two rivers. The river is a biological Site of Special Scientific Interest and Special Area of Conservation.

The Wensum is the principal river on which the city of Norwich was founded. The river passes Carrow Road, the home of Norwich City F.C.; one end of the ground was originally named The River End in its honour, a name that still persists among fans.

== Etymology ==
The river receives its name from the Old English adjective wandsum or wendsum, meaning "winding".

== Course ==
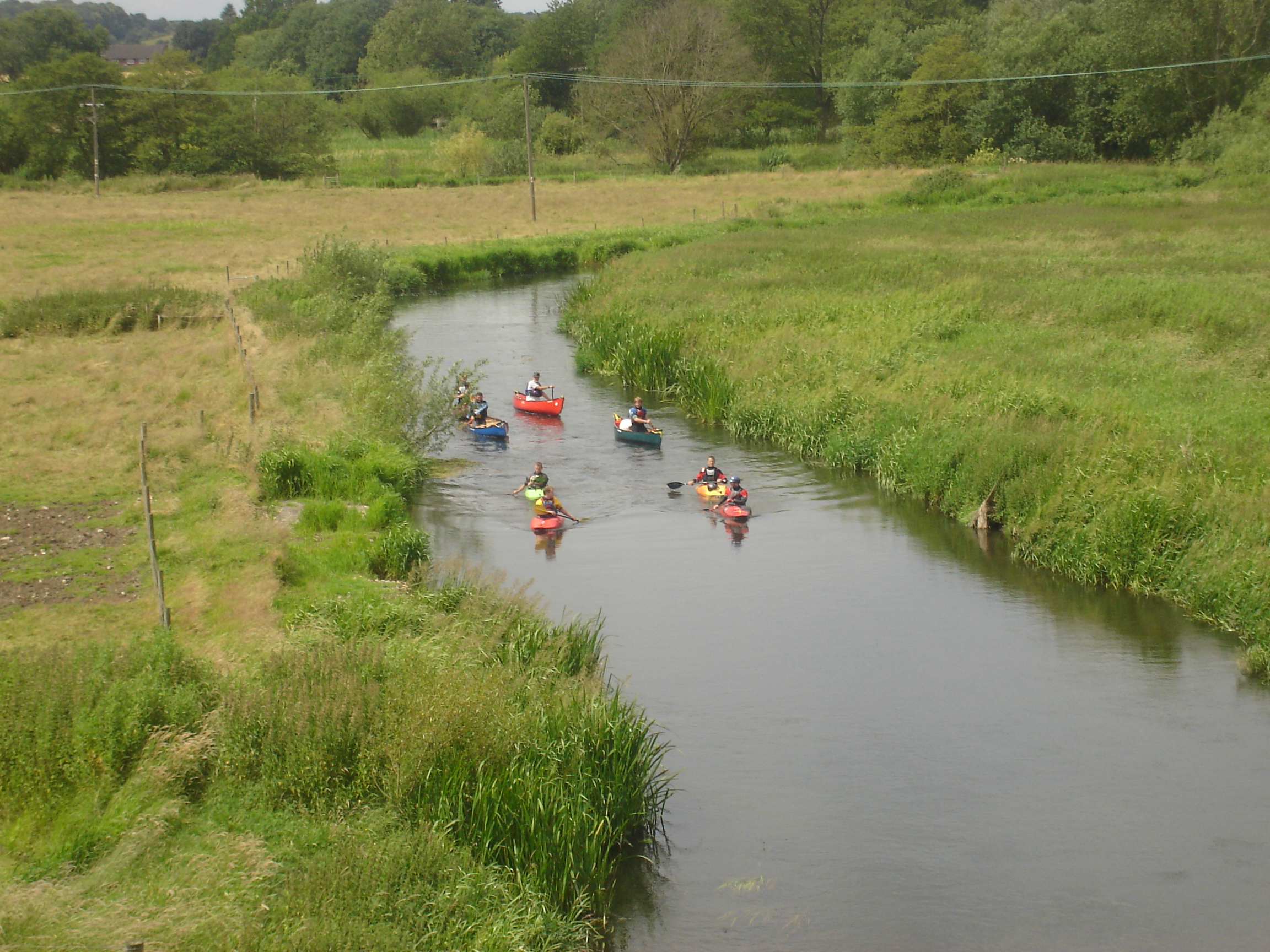
The river viewed from Marriott's Way, Costessey

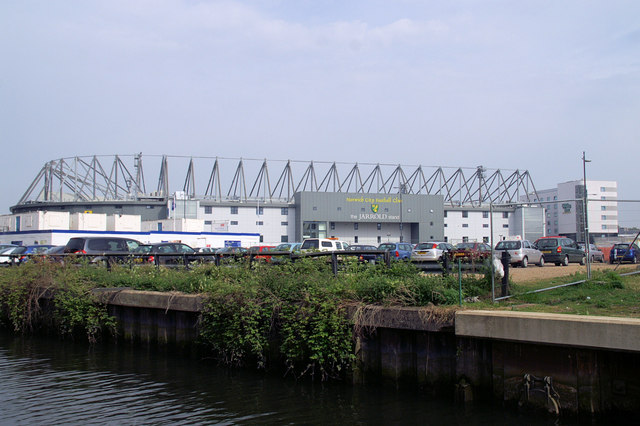
Carrow Road, viewed from the river

Modern Ordnance Survey Maps list the source of the Wensum as lying between the villages of Colkirk and Whissonsett in northwest Norfolk. The reasoning behind this claim is unknown given that other tributaries are further from the mouth; pre-modern maps and other written sources refer to the source to be in West Rudham from springs arising on the aptly named Wensum Farm. From the source the river flows close to the villages of South Raynham, West Raynham and East Raynham, passing Raynham Hall, home of the Marquis Townshend. The Wensum then turns and flows north through a number of small villages until it reaches Sculthorpe, where it turns east through the market town of Fakenham. The river then flows in a southeasterly direction through the Pensthorpe Nature Reserve and the village of Great Ryburgh.

The Wensum continues through or close to the villages of Guist, North Elmham, Worthing, Swanton Morley, Lyng, Lenwade and Taverham before entering the City of Norwich from the north-west via Drayton, Costessey and Hellesdon. At New Mills Yard, a former waterworks, the river becomes tidal and navigable by boat. Flowing through the city, the river forms a broad arc which would have influenced the site of the settlement for defensive reasons; remnants of boom towers can be seen near Wensum Park and Carrow Hill which formed part of the city wall and a large defensive tower can be seen on the bank near Barrack Street, called Cow Tower. This dates to the 12th century and was also used for collecting tolls. Evidence of the river's historical use as a means of transport for goods and trade from the continent is still visible: mills, quays and industrial remnants can be found near the station and along King Street, and a slipway at Pulls Ferry marks the start of a canal originally used to transport stone from Caen in Normandy, in the 13th Century, to build Norwich Cathedral. This site was also a public house and used as a River Ferry until the 1950s.

The Wensum flows past Carrow Road football ground and then out of the city via Trowse to Whitlingham and its confluence with the River Yare. The Wensum is navigable from New Mills Yard in the centre of Norwich.

== Tributaries ==
- River Tat. Rises on Syderstone Common and merges with the Wensum west of Fakenham
- River Tud. Rises a little south of East Dereham and merges with the Wensum just below Hellesdon mill.
- River Ainse. Merges with the River Wensum at Lenwade.
- Norwich cockeys. A group of subterraneous streams flowing into the Wensum at Norwich, including the Muspole, Dalymond, Great Cockey, Dallingfleet, and Fresflete.

== Watermills ==
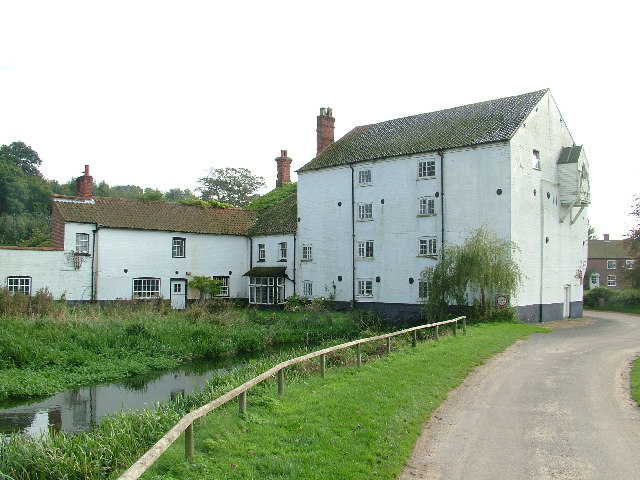
Bintree Mill, 2005 (photo by Mark Boyer)

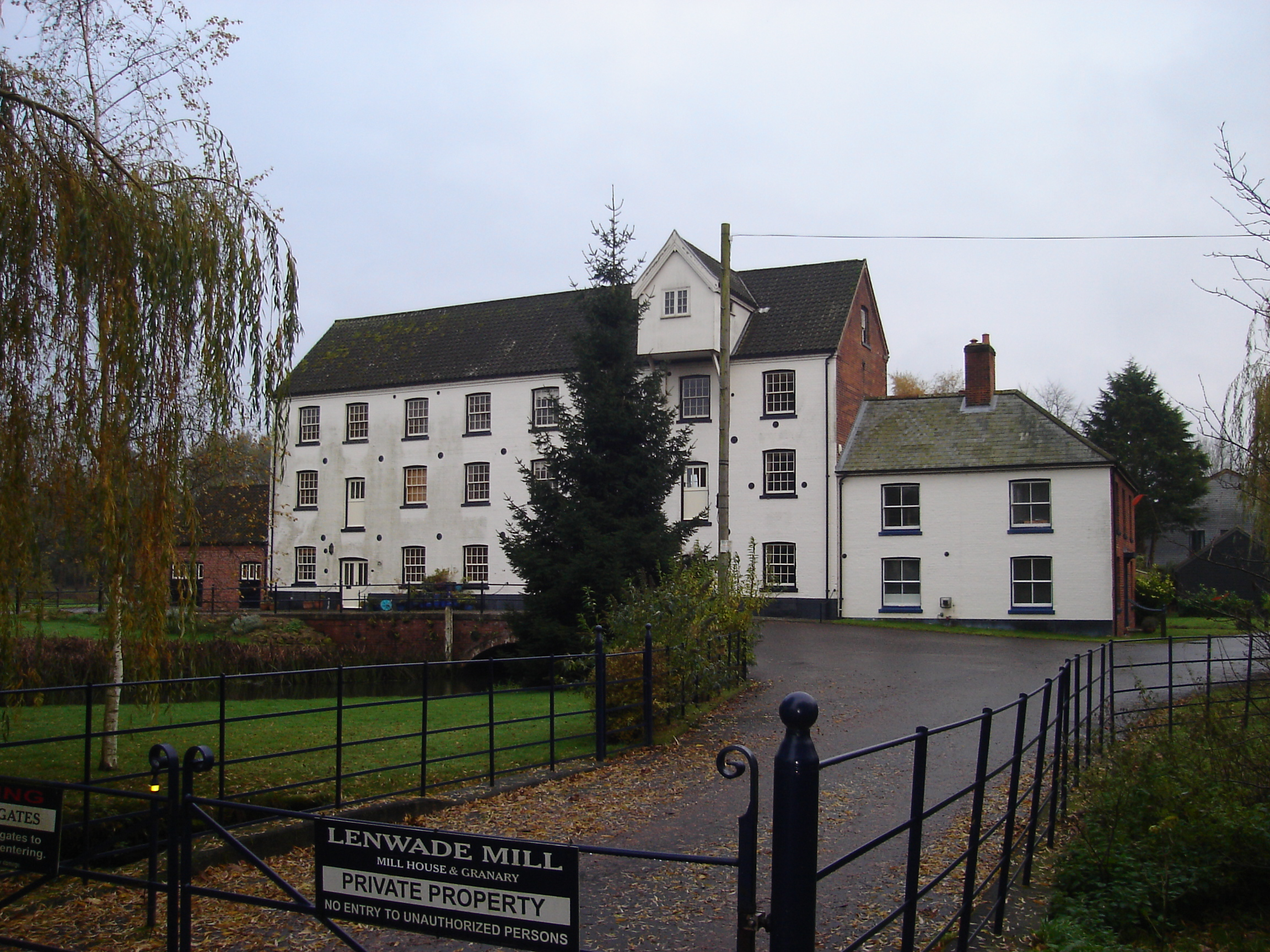
Lenwade mill

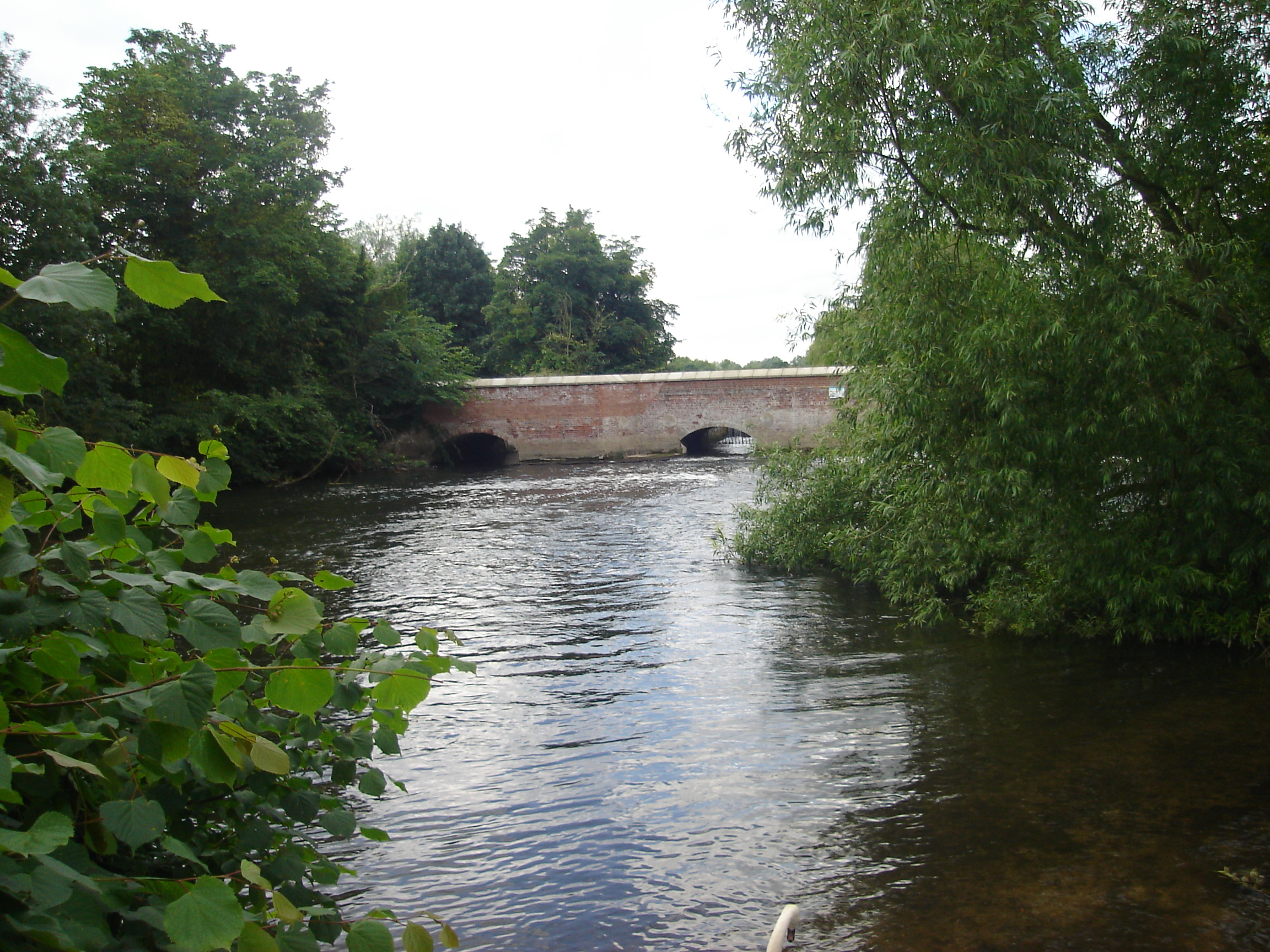
The river below Hellesdon mill

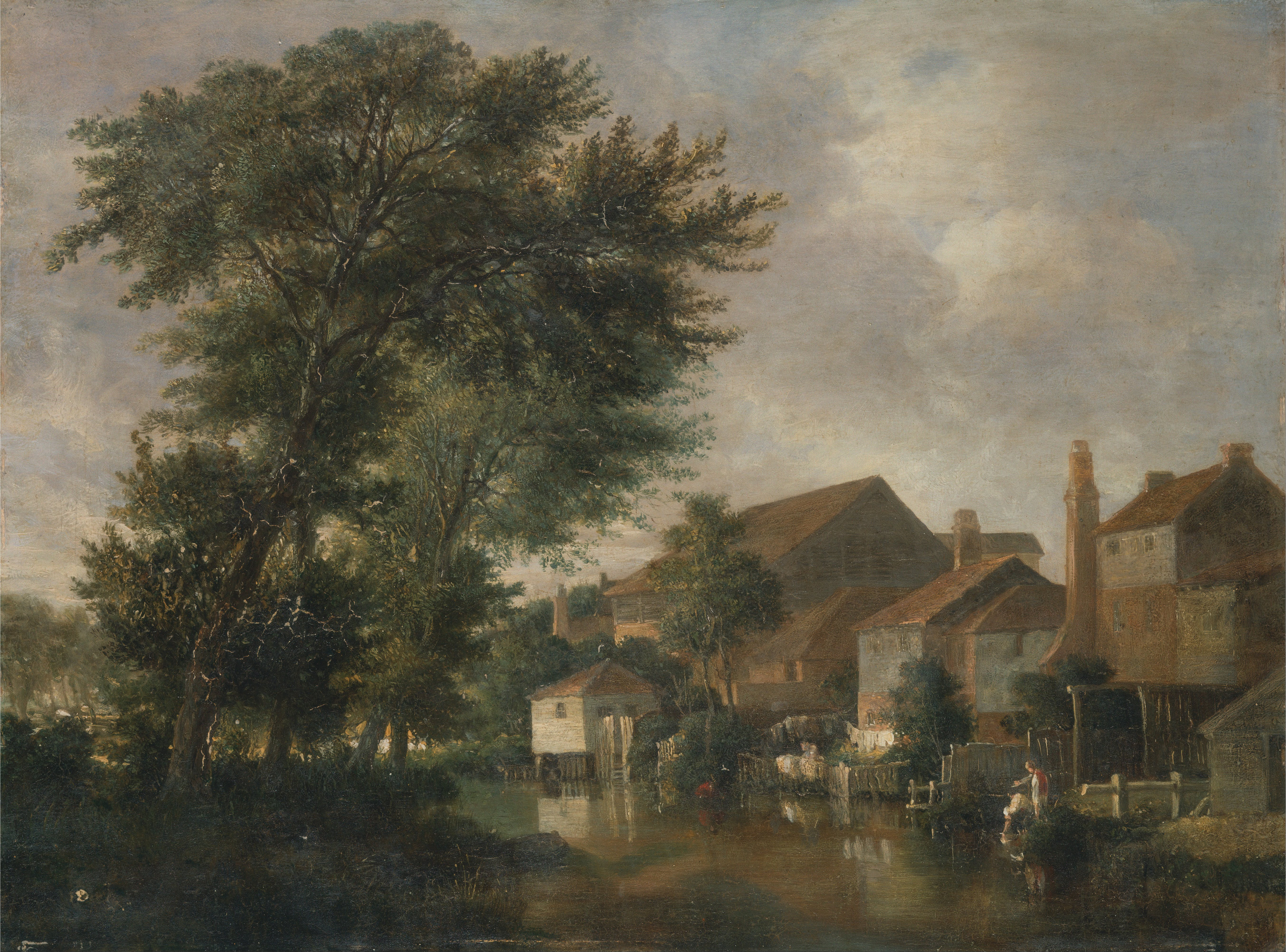
The River Wensum, Norwich by John Crome, 1814

There was a succession of water mills on the Wensum, some of which are still standing and working. From the source these are:

- Sculthorpe Mill. The 18th century water mill which bridges the river was converted into a hotel and restaurant in 2003.
- Hempton Mill. The mill was operational before 1849, as it was auctioned in that year to pay the debts of the miller, who had died. It was constructed of brick and weatherboard, with three storeys and an attic. Skulthorpe, Hempton and Fakenham mills had to work in conjunction, to conserve their water supplies, and the millers used smoke signals to tell the others that they were opening their sluices. The mill had become derelict by 1954 and was demolished in June by the East Suffolk and Norfolk River Board. This allowed the river levels to be lowered by around 2 feet (0.6 m), improving land drainage of the surrounding land.
- Fakenham Mill. The first known mill at the site was built in 1620, but this was replaced by a new mill around 1720. The new mill, which bridged the river, was constructed of red and yellow bricks with a slate roof. By the early 20th century, steam power was being used to supplement the water wheel, which drove four pairs of stones and the ancillary equipment. The mill was in use until 1979 and was converted into homes in 1982.
- Great Ryburgh Mill. There was a mill at Great Ryburgh at the time of the Domesday Book, compiled in 1086, but it was probably at Southmylle, and the site was reused for a mill house when a new larger mill was built. This had two storeys of brick and another three clad in weatherboard. The waterwheel was replaced by a water turbine in 1858, which powered six pairs of stones, and was supplemented by a steam engine in 1875. The engine was built by Holmes & Sons of Norwich. In 1893, three pairs of stones were replaced by a roller mill system. Only one storey remained by 1977, and by 2003 most of the rest of the structure had been demolished.
- Guist Mill. This was quite small, and was located next to a toll bridge. Few other details about it are known.
- Bintry Mill ceased operation in 1980, but the building is still extant. It was used as the location for a film of George Eliot's The Mill on the Floss in 1996.
- North Elmham Mill, known locally as Grint Mill, had two breastshot waterwheels until the early twentieth century when they were replaced by two turbines. By the 1970s the milling machinery was driven by mains electricity while the turbines were used to drive a sack hoist and two mixing machines. The mill continued to produce animal feed into the late twentieth century.
- Swanton Morley Mill was demolished in the 1840s.
- Elsing Mill ceased operation in 1970. The building is still extant.
- Lyng Mill was demolished in 1868.
- Lenwade Mill. The Grade II listed building was at risk in the 1990s, but was sympathetically converted into apartments in 2000.
- Taverham Mill. In the 19th century Taverham was a major producer of paper. Some of the paper which was produced at Taverham Mill was used in producing The Times and the Oxford English Dictionary. It also served the University Press at Cambridge. The paper mill closed in 1899.
- Costessey Mill was destroyed by a fire in 1924.
- Hellesdon Mill was demolished for building materials in 1920.
- Norwich New Mills. A corn mill was built in 1430 by public subscription. In 1710, it was rebuilt to grind corn and supply water to the city. In 1897, it became an air compressor station, with three electric and two water powered compressors. The compressed air was used to pump sewage out of the city, using Shone ejector pumps, which were invented by Isaac Shone in 1887. Operation ceased in 1972, when the only other Shone ejector pumps in the country were those under the Houses of Parliament. Plans for it to become a working museum failed, but all the machinery is still intact. The sluice is now computer operated to control water levels.

Other mill closures on tributaries were:

- Great Witchingham Mill is on the River Aisne and was built in 1666. The waterwheel was removed in 1948, and it was powered by electricity until it ceased to be used for milling around 1970. It was renovated from a semi-derelict state between 1992 and 2003, and is now a home.
- Gressenhall Mill is on the River Whitewater. The site was used for milling from the time of Edward the Confessor (died 1066). The last mill building to be erected on the site was built in 1847, and worked until 1914, when it was destroyed by a fire.
- Worthing Mill is on the River Blackwater, and the site dates from Saxon times. The final mill, which was built entierely of brick, ceased to be used for milling around 1920. It is now a home.
- Felthorpe Mill was powered by water from a beck on the Haveringland Hall estate. Documentary sources show that there was a mill at the site in 1797. The building latterly had three storeys, one built of brick and two weatherboarded. A breastshot wheel drove three pairs of stones, and a steam engine was also in use by 1883. Milling ceased soon after 1918, and it was then used as a blacksmith's shop until it was demolished in 1927.

== Bridges at Norwich ==
Bishops Bridge is positioned on the site of a Roman ford. Built in 1345, it is one of five medieval bridges which span the River Wensum, and was designed to form part of the defensive structure of Norwich. The bridge's gatehouse was demolished in 1791.

Jarrold Bridge is a footbridge linking the St James Place business park to Bishopgate.

Fye Bridge is arguably the oldest river crossing in Norwich and is the gate to the North of the City known as "Norwich Over the Water" this bridge was also the site of a cucking stool for ducking lawbreakers and undesirables.

Whitefriars Bridge Named after a former Carmelite (White Friars) monastery. The remains of which can still be seen in a small section of medieval wall and archway.

Foundry Bridge Near the railway station and the Yacht station on Riverside named after a foundry nearby, purported to have been built to take a railway line.

Lady Julian Bridge is a footbridge named after Julian of Norwich that links Riverside to King Street.

Carrow Bridge near Carrow Road football ground is a more recent cantilevered swing bridge, which can still be opened to allow large or high vessels through. It is positioned in close proximity to the Boom towers which originally had a chain suspended between them and would have been used as part of the city's defences and as a method of collecting tolls on goods travelling up river from Great Yarmouth.

Novi Sad Friendship Bridge is a cable stayed swing footbridge which spans the River Wensum in Norwich. The structure is named in recognition of the twinning ties between Norwich and Novi Sad in Serbia. The bridge was designed by Buro Happold and commissioned by Norfolk County Council.

There are further bridges at St Crispin's Road, Duke Street and St George's Street.

== Conservation ==
After many years of decline a survey was commissioned by Natural England in 2002. It showed that the ecological condition of the river had declined. The principal reasons for this were water quality and siltation. Water quality has been addressed and was improving, but the physical character of the river needs to be restored. In 2008, a partnership known as the River Wensum Restoration Strategy (RWRS) was formed between; Environment Agency; Water Management Alliance and Natural England to restore the physical functioning of the Wensum. The 2002 report found that fourteen redundant water mills along the Wensum as having the most significant factor affecting morphology of the river channel, with 67% of the river backed up behind these structures. As a priority, the strategy recommended the lowering, removal or bypassing of these structures to allow more of the river to function naturally. Since 2008, the (RWRS) has made several improvements to the river. The holistic whole river approach with co-operation from land owners, fisheries managers and other organisations has seen ongoing projects ranging from restoring gravel glides to removing silt.

The Norfolk Anglers Conservation Association (NACA) carried out a successful river habitat restoration at their Sayers Meadow fishery at Lyng in the early 1980s. After dredging and a major abstraction pipeline had a detrimental effect on the Costessey Point fishery, the association has taken action to restore this well known water. The ongoing work will be used as a blueprint for future river conservation projects.

The Demonstration Test Catchment (DTC) project is a joint initiative between the Environment Agency, (Defra), and the Welsh Assembly Government working in three UK catchments; Hampshire Avon; River Eden, Cumbria; Wensum, Norfolk to evaluate the extent to which on-farm mitigation measures can cost-effectively reduce the impacts of diffuse water pollution on river ecology while still maintaining food production capacity (Wensum Alliance, 2014).

== Angling ==
Between 1940 and the 1970s the river had a national reputation as a roach fishery with specimens exceeding 3 pounds (1.4 kg) being reported. As the river declined through the effects of abstraction, dredging and modern farming methods these fish largely died out. After an earlier introduction of a small amount of barbel – a fish not thought to be indigenous to the Wensum – the local river authority stocked the Wensum with over 150 fish in 1971 below Costessey Mill. and subsequently stocked more fish at suitable sections of the Upper Wensum.

== Water quality ==
The Environment Agency measures the water quality of the waterways in England. Each is given an overall ecological status, which may be one of five levels: high, good, moderate, poor and bad. There are several components that are used to determine this, including biological status, which looks at the quantity and varieties of invertebrates, angiosperms and fish. Chemical status, which compares the concentrations of various chemicals against known safe concentrations, is rated good or fail.

The water quality of the River Wensum system was as follows in 2019/2022.

Section	Ecological status	Chemical status	Length	Catchment	Channel
Wensum (to Tatterford)	Moderate	Fail	6.3 miles (10.1 km)	23.02 square miles (59.6 km^{2})	heavily modified
Wensum US Norwich	Moderate	Fail	40.8 miles (65.7 km)	73.07 square miles (189.3 km^{2})	heavily modified
Wensum DS Norwich	Moderate	Fail	5.6 miles (9.0 km)	12.55 square miles (32.5 km^{2})	heavily modified

Reasons for the water quality being less than good are mainly due to physical modification of the channel, as a result of its use for milling, and surface water abstraction, which reduces the flow. Like most waterways in the UK, the chemical status changed from good to fail in 2019, due to the presence of polybrominated diphenyl ethers (PBDE) which had not previously been included in the assessment.

== See also ==
- List of rivers in England
