= Foundry Bridge, Norwich =

Bridge in Norwich, England

Foundry Bridge
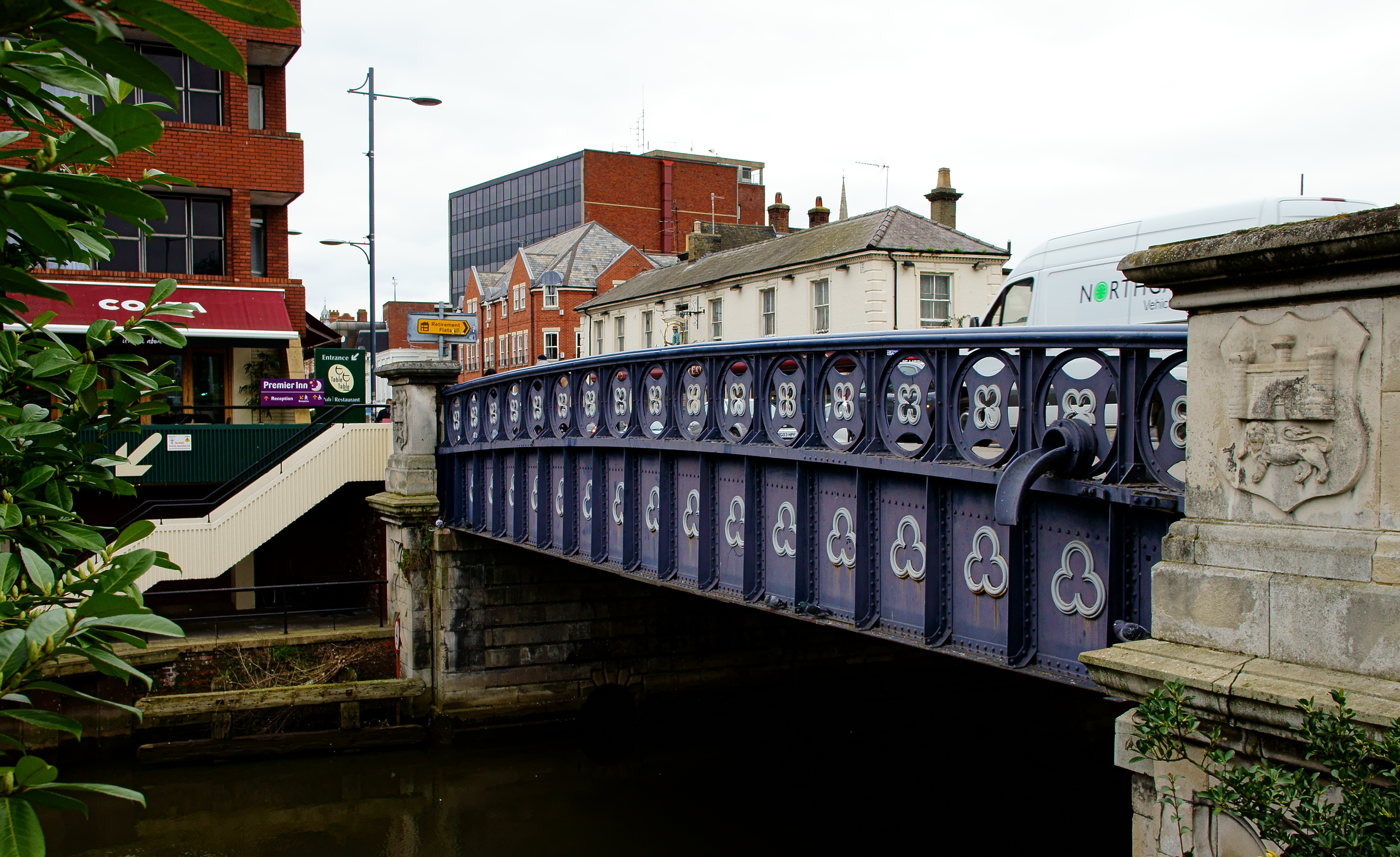
- Foundry Bridge in 2013
- Coordinates: 52.627944°N 1.305762°E
- OS grid reference: TG 238 085
- Carries: Prince Of Wales Road
- Crosses: River Wensum
- Locale: Norwich, England

Characteristics
- Trough construction: Wrought iron
- Pier construction: Stone
- Width: 16.4 metres (54 ft)
- Clearance below: 3.05 metres (10.0 ft)

History
- Built: 1886
- Construction cost: £12,000

Statistics

Listed Building – Grade II
- Designated: 5 June 1972
- Reference no.: 1051908

Location
- Interactive map of Foundry Bridge

Foundry Bridge is a grade II listed stone and wrought iron bridge over the River Wensum in Norwich, England, carrying Prince of Wales Road, and linking Norwich railway station to the city centre. There have been three different bridge structures on the site. The first, completed in 1811, was made of timber and stone. This was replaced by a cast-iron bridge in 1844, and the current bridge was constructed in 1886.

== History ==
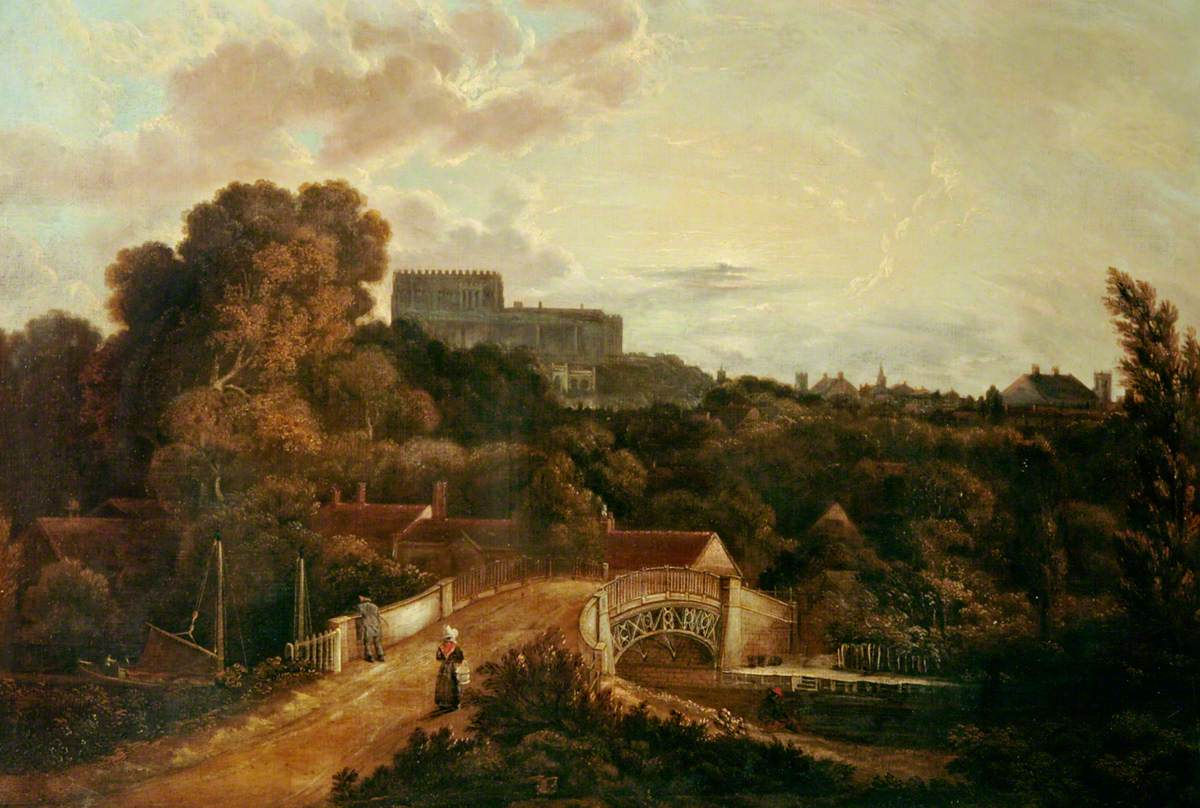
A Robert Ladbrooke painting of the original Foundry Bridge between c. 1822–1833

The first bridge was built on the site in 1810–11. At the time, the area was a rural site. However, an old iron foundry was situated nearby, giving Foundry Bridge its name. This original bridge featured a timber deck on stone piers, and allowed the occasional horse-drawn cart to pass on the byway. On 4 April 1817, just after leaving the Foundry Bridge, a Norwich and Yarmouth steamer exploded, killing ten people and injuring five.

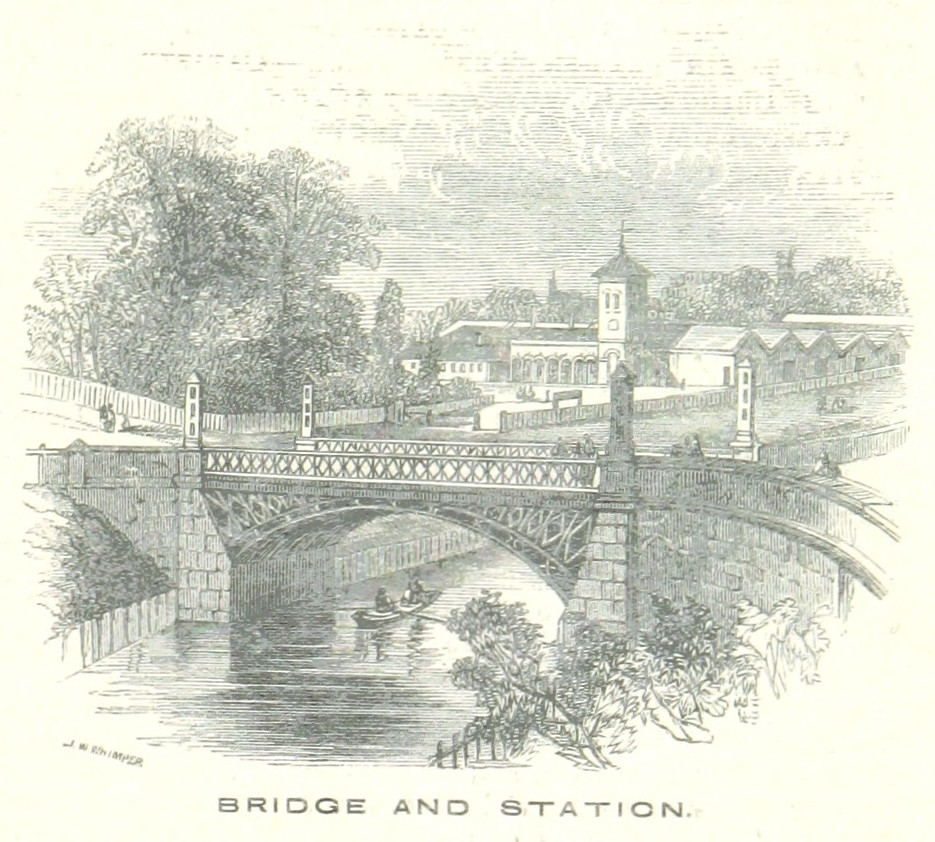
An etching of the cast iron Foundry Bridge in 1851

In April 1844, the opening of the first railway between Norwich and Yarmouth was opened, and Norwich railway station was built on the east side of the river, stimulating development in the area. The same year, the original bridge was replaced by a cast iron bridge for improved access, funded jointly by the city and the Norfolk Railway Company.

A third bridge, the present one, was constructed from 1884 to 1886, costing £12,000, to which the Great Eastern Railway Company made a contribution of £1,200. P. P. Marshall led the construction, during which its main girders were fabricated in the station yard, and then launched sideways into position from the old bridge. A report to the Norwich Town Council on its completion noted that the original estimate for its cost was £13,000, and that its 50-foot width was five feet more than originally intended.

== Architecture ==
The present single-span wrought iron bridge has a wrought span of 55 feet (17 m), comprising four main girders at 4.17 feet (1.27 m) deep. Between the parapets is a girth of 50 feet (15 m). It has circular openwork panels above its parapet, each with a quatrefoil, and sexfoiled panels under the parapet. It features brick parapets at each corner (except south-west) with rusticated abutments, ending in brick piers. Its stone piers have moulded caps at each corner, each bearing the arms of the city of Norwich. The cockey, or subterranean river, known as Fresflete outflows directly under Foundry Bridge.

== See also ==
- Blackfriars Bridge, Norwich, another stone and iron bridge in Norwich
- Media related to Foundry Bridge, Norwich at Wikimedia Commons
