= William Cuningham =

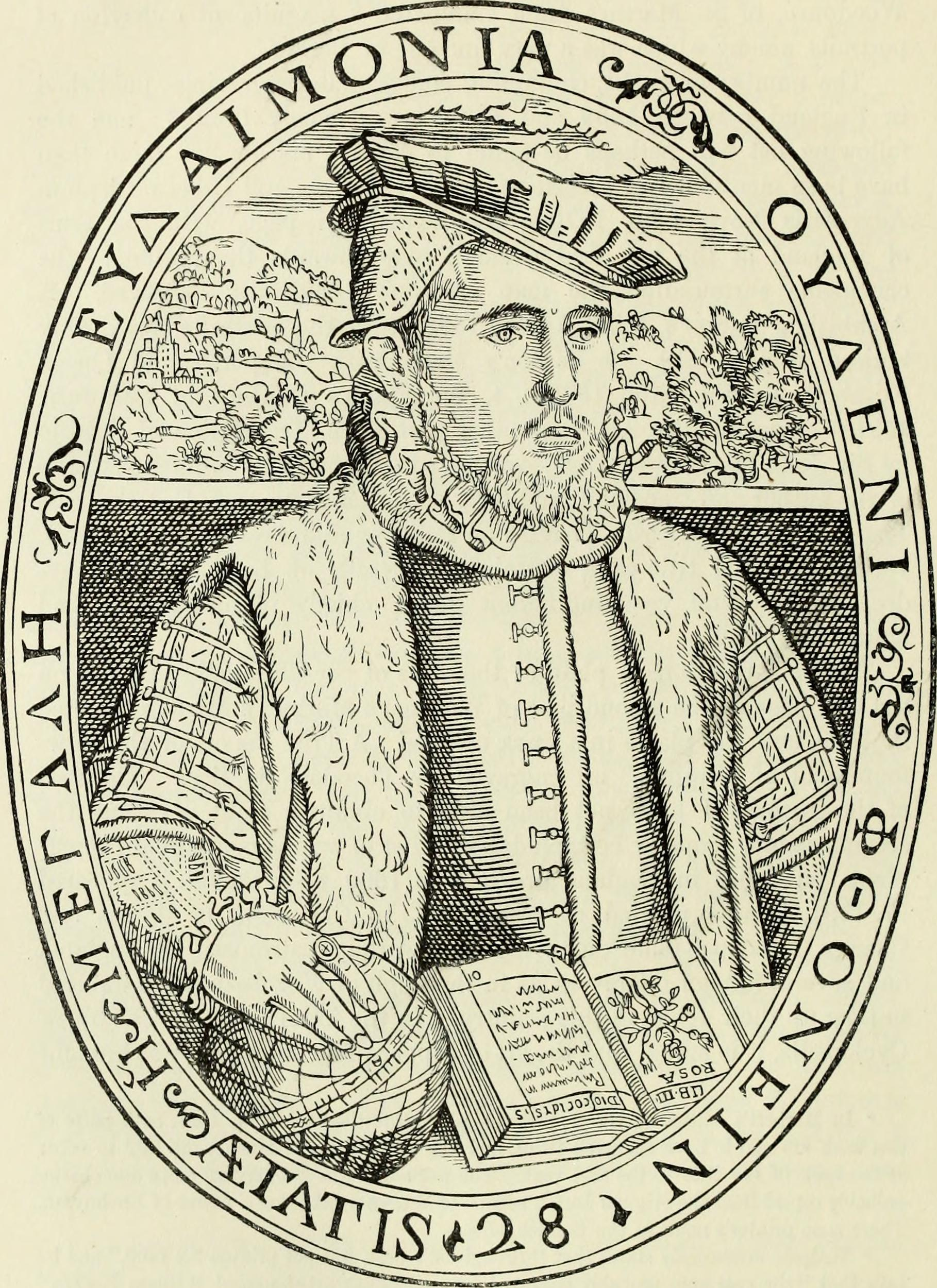
A portrait of Cuningham from The Cosmographical Glasse (1559)

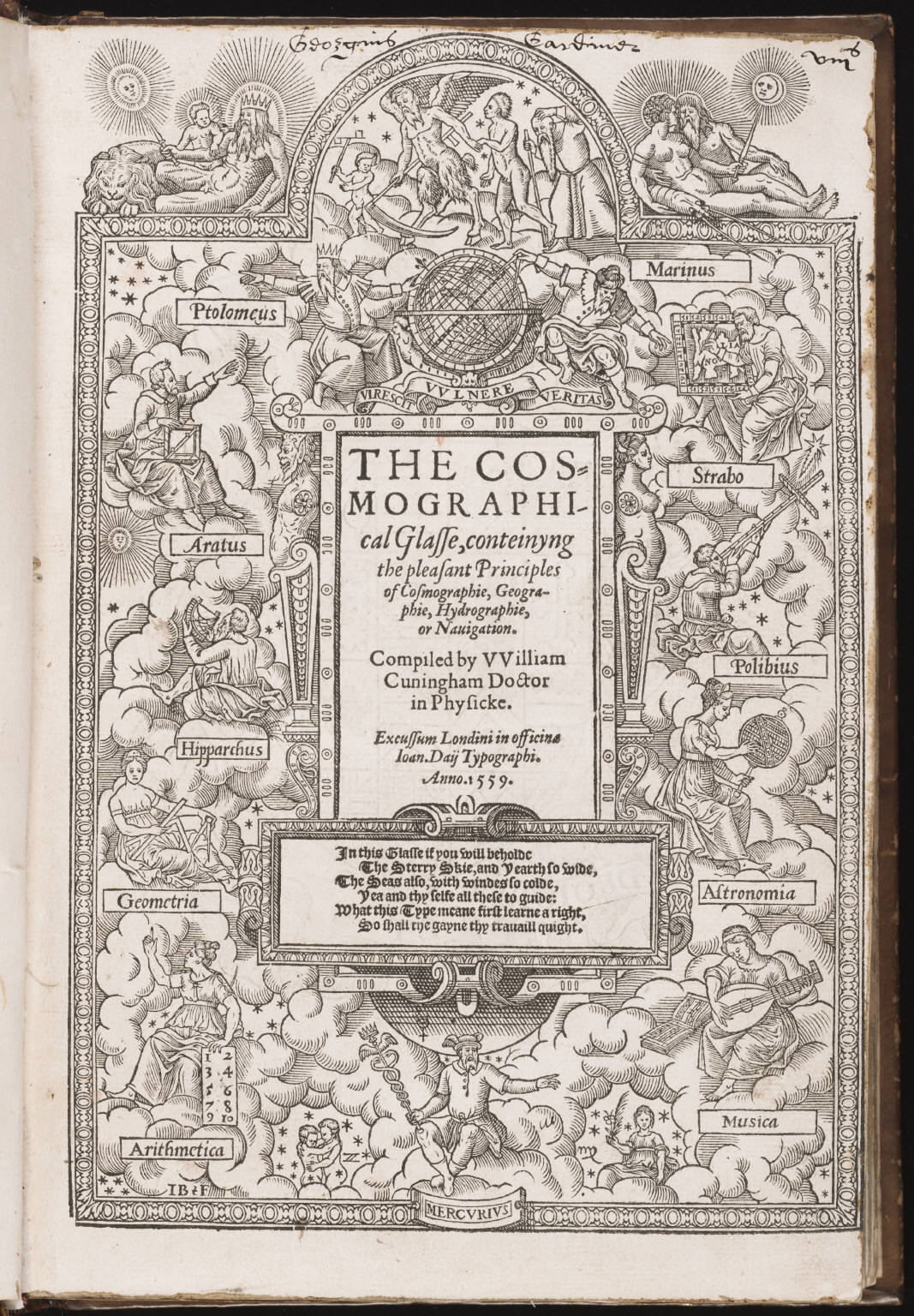
Title page of The Cosmographical Glasse

William Cuningham, also known as Kenningham, was a 16th-century English physician, astrologer, and engraver. He practised at Norwich around 1559. Cunningham published his work The Cosmographical Glasse that year. It contains many woodcuts and an aerial view map of Norwich.

On 15 May 1551, Cuningham was admitted to Corpus Christi College, Cambridge. In 1557 he received his MB at Cambridge, then studied medicine for seven years. Cuningham also studied at the University of Heidelberg. It is supposed that he was received his MD at Heidelberg about 1559, at which period he changed his name from Keningham to Cuningham.

Cuningham built a reputation as a physician in London, he was also noted for his skill in I astrology. In 1563, he was appointed public lecturer at Surgeons' Hall.

Cuningham's death date is unknown.

== Bibliography ==
- 1558: A New Almanacke and Prognostication (new edition 1565)
- 1559: The Cosmographical Glasse, conteinyng the Pleasant Principles of Cosmographie, Geographie, Hydrographie or Navigation
- 1560: An Invective Epistle in Defense of Astrologers
