= Cuningham Prospect =

1559 perspective plan of Norwich, England

The Cuningham Prospect plan of Norwich within The Cosmographical Glasse (1559). It notably depicts Mercury (top), and the characters Philonicus and Spoudaeus, or Cuningham and an apprentice, pointing north (bottom).

Nordovicum Angliae Civitas 1558 (Norwich, a City in England 1558), often referred to as the Cuningham Prospect, is a perspective plan of the city of Norwich, England, published in 1559 in William Cuningham's work The Cosmographical Glasse. Included in the book to teach readers the distinction between geography, cosmography and chorography, it is considered an inaccurate map by present-day historians because Cuningham made several changes to depict the city as healthy according to Hippocratic tradition. These included the map's east-up direction, the non-depiction of some rundown streets that had been victim to 1507 fires or Kett's Rebellion in 1549, and the non-depiction of marshland, incorrectly thought to cause disease. It was copied several times by mapmakers over the subsequent centuries. Its creation made Norwich the first regional city in England to commission its own map, and it is the earliest surviving printed map of an English provincial town.

== Description ==
The upper section of the page features rain clouds which gather overhead. Amongst these include, in the top left corner, the coat of arms of Elizabeth I. The deity Mercury, patron of financial gain, commerce and travel, is depicted above the city. In the top right are the civic arms of Norwich.

In the background of the plan, Norwich itself is depicted on an east–west axis, with the east at the top of the page and north to the left, as though the viewer were arriving from London, The River Wensum flows in a gentle sweep around the top of the map. Outside the depicted city walls, are shown well-tended fields and woodland. Windmills are depicted on the rolling hills to the north-east. Within the walls, well-appointed buildings are shown in the central and western areas, and trees, orchards, fields and pastures are shown in the northern, eastern and southern peripheries; practising archers and cattle are shown the chapel field. Norwich Over the Water is depicted on the map's left side. Norwich Castle is visible alongside its mound, access bridge and the shire hall. The five bridges of the city; Bishopsgate, Whitefriars, Fye, St George's, and Coslany, are also present on the map. St Peter Mancroft is present, with what is now known as Bethel Street running up to its tower entrance. Due to the nature of the map's viewpoint, some streets are obscured such as King Street.

In a later version of the plan, a compass was included in the foreground which features either the two characters from the book's dialogue Philonicus and Spoudaeus, or Cuningham in his doctor's habit explaining his calculations to an apprentice, both with one arm pointing north.

== History ==
The Cuningham Prospect is preceded by the Norwich Sanctuary Map of 1541, an incomplete map of the city that intended to show all of the city's places of sanctuary.

=== Creation ===
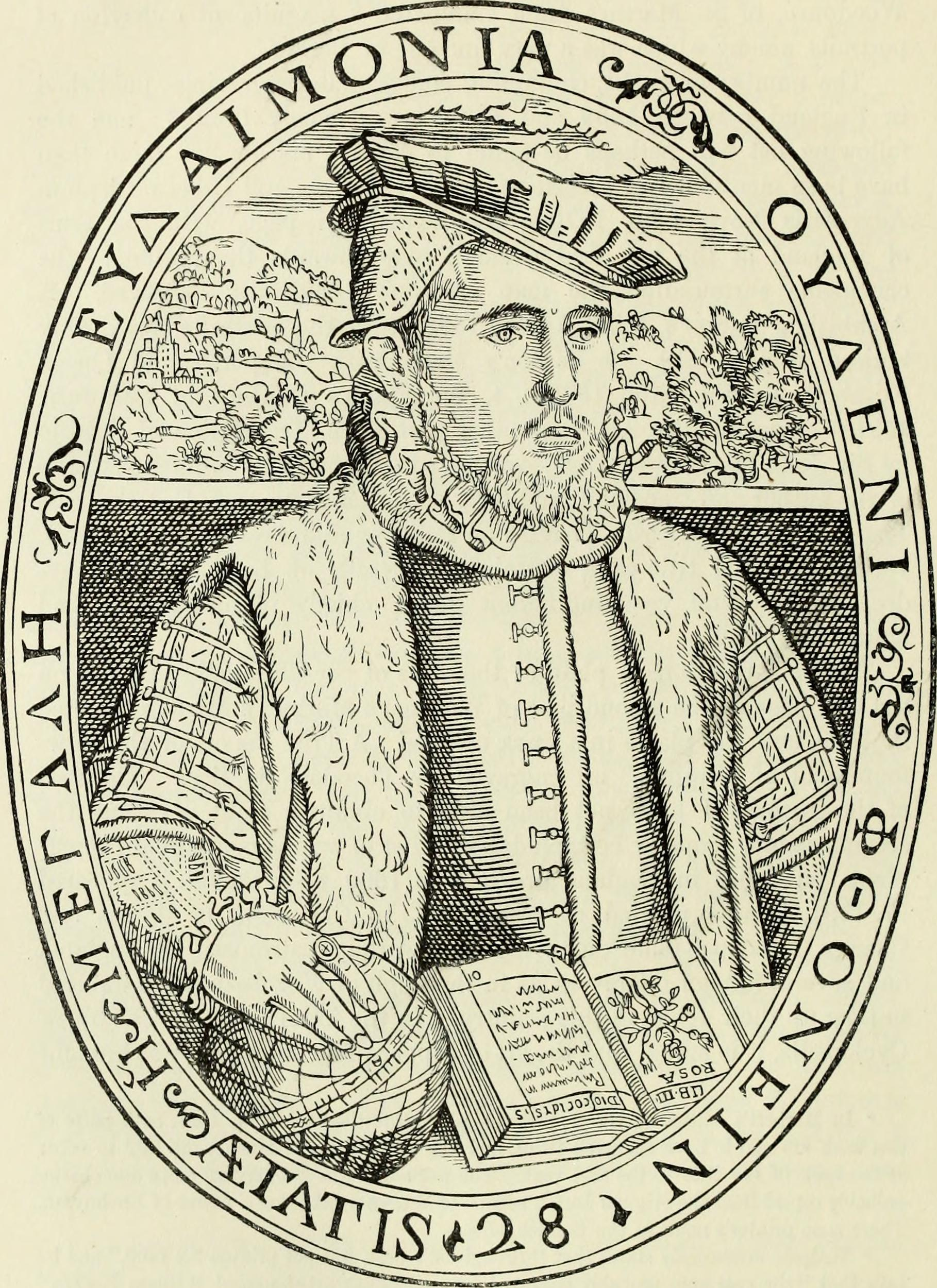
A portrait of Cuningham from The Cosmographical Glasse

Cuningham, a physician, had learned triangulation and longitudinal calculation during his travels in Europe. He began collaborating with London printer John Day from around 1556. He returned to Norwich from Corpus Christi College, Cambridge by November 1556, and was still stationed in Norwich in March 1557 and July 1559. He worked on The Cosmographical Glasse during this period, likely drawing up the prospect of Norwich between 1556 and 1558 before moving to London in 1563. Surveying therefore likely began under the rule of Mary I and the map was completed under Elizabeth I. Its creation also lines up with one of the city's most severe epidemics of influenza. Matthew Champion, however, has argued that the survey took place at least a decade before 1556. While the Norwich corporation did not officially sponsor the survey, but the requirement of support from influential people for such a project means they were likely appraised or involved in its production.

To create the map itself, a plane table surveying instrument was used, making use of three-dimensional illusionism. Cuningham used church towers in Norwich as corners of triangles, applying trigonometry to their sides and surveying the features within these triangles.

The decision to orient the plan on an east–west axis with the Wensum positioned at the top of the city from this perspective was, according to historian Isla Fae, likely a conscious decision in line with the Hippocratic theory that easterly situations, including aspects, winds and water supply, were seen as the most healthy. This idea was popular at the time of the map's creation.

Following the survey's completion, John Bettes was commissioned to engrave it. The plan was printed as a woodcut and inserted between pages 7 and 8 of Cuningham's most famous work, The Cosmographical Glasse, in a passage of the text that explained the ancient Ptolemaic distinction between geography, cosmography and chorography. Cuningham particularly used the plan as a visual explanation of chorography, the purpose of which he wrote was to illustrate "the qualitie and figure", or form, of a place. This was done through a dialogue between two characters; Philonicus and Spoudaeus. One character explains the difference between these disciplines and the other character replies:

"Although by your wordes, I have received more commoditie at this present, then by all my readyng touching the true diference of these three names: yet if it may please you to geve me the figures of every of them, I shall so stedfastly printe it in my mynde, as I truste not to forget them, for it is truly said, thinges sene have longer impresion then only harde."

=== Use and copies ===
The map became an enduring representation of Norwich among the public in England and Europe. In 1576, Sir Martin Frobisher took The Cosmographical Glasse, and thus the Prospect, with him to find a north-west passage to Cathay.

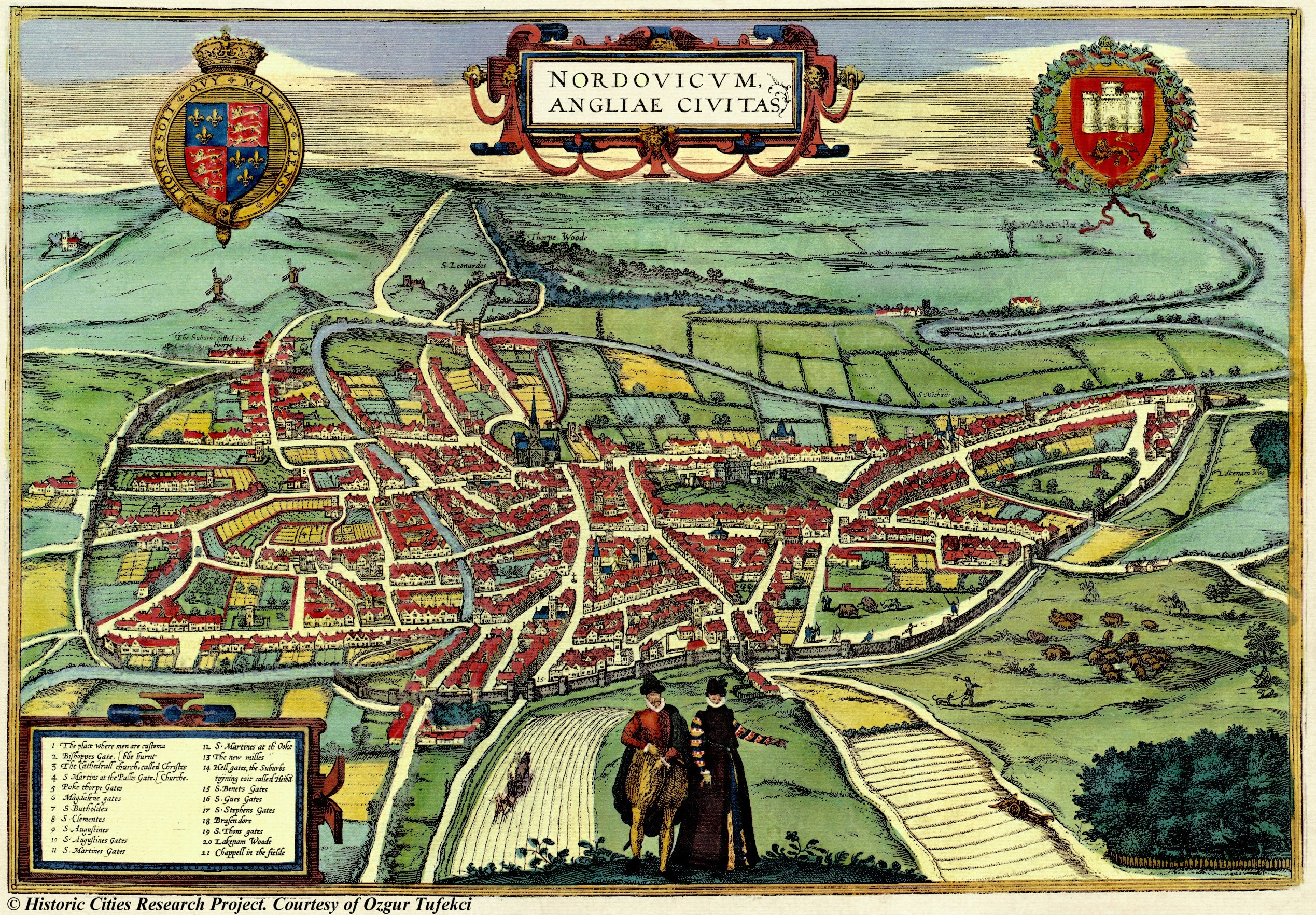
Georg Braun and Frans Hogenberg's prospect of Norwich in Civitates Orbis Terrarum (1581) features a prospect based on Cuningham's

The Cuningham Prospect had an influence on cartography in Norwich for generations, creating a baseline design for subsequent maps with all 14 maps and prospects from the 1559 until 1696 being based on it. These entered printed geographies and educational texts in various forms. In 1581 in Cologne, a map based on Cuningham's was published in Georg Braun and Frans Hogenberg's major cartographic project Civitates Orbis Terrarum. A near-contemporary of Cunningham reproduced the Cuningham Prospect in 1588, adding another lettered compass which similarly showed north to the left and east at the top. In 1611, the Cuningham Prospect was used in John Speed's map of Norfolk.

Further copies were made, and these copies homogenised. In 1631, a significantly simplified version of the Prospect was published in Frankfurt as part of a collection of European city scenes, under the health-associated Latin title Remedia ad sanitatem servandam creata sunt ('Medicines were created to preserve health'), by Daniel Meisner. This was created in copper in Eberhard Kieser's workshop. It was featured in his emblem book Thesaurus Philopoliticus VII, and features an image of a chameleon, or a salamander, shaded by a bay tree on which perches a raven. This possibly references Cuningham who had written a book on a disease which he had dubbed chamaeleontiasis, though if it is a salamander it likely represents poison, and the raven represents death, as explained by a poem below which continues Norwich's reputation for health. This version is only identifiable as a copy of Cuningham's because of the civic arms in the top right as well as the presence of the walls and river.

Copies were made by Walton in 1668 and Cornelli in 1706. The copies by Meisner, Walton and Cornelli all only have the shape of the city walls and the surrounding countryside to distinguish Norwich from any other contemporary city. Thomas Cleer's 1696 'new mapp' of Norwich was the first to move away from Cuningham's design, being a two-dimensional street plan, though it proved unpopular among contemporaries.

In the present day, the Cuningham Prospect appears often in books about Tudor cartography and in histories of Norwich.

== Inaccuracies ==
The Cuningham Prospect has been referred to as both accurate – a realistic reconstruction of Norwich as Cuningham actually saw it, in Cuningham's words, "as the forme it is" – and more recently as an idealised, manipulated image of the city. Cuningham employed many techniques to improve the appearance of Norwich, emphasising what were thought to be health-promoting features and obscuring the opposite.

=== Natural features ===
Changes were made to natural features; Cuningham depicted the Wensum as wide and quick-flowing, though later visitors described it as narrow and slow, and Norwich was frequently a victim of flooding. In reality, the city had extensive water-meadows and marshland, which according to the Hippocratic tradition would cause an unpleasant smell and lead to fatal disease. The land was also low-lying. Marshland is thus not depicted on the plan, with lush greenery in its place.

=== Buildings and structures ===
Norwich's buildings are also manipulated on the map, reformulated into a grid pattern to display order and depicted as sturdy and regular, which was false in many cases. The clustering of buildings does appear accurate and buildings are shown according to convention in most cases.

The effects of masonry theft on the city walls are not depicted on Cuningham's map, nor was the decay of the castle at the time. Other buildings are absent entirely, including three of the city's five leper hospitals and not labelling the other two as hospitals. The Great Hospital on Bishopsgate was instead shown as an area of open ground. The 11th century flint wall that surrounded the city's cathedral precinct also does not appear on the map; Melissa Gaudoin has suggested that this was to show the desegregation of church land from the city after the Reformation, the wall being controversial locally, though it could have simply been a mistake. Churches depicted include the Protestant St Peter Parmentergate, what is likely St John de Sepulchre and St Stephen. They also include St Botolph which was demolished before the survey, as well as St Martin on the Hill and St Leonard which were in private ownership by the assumed time that the survey took place. Some historians have inferred from this that Cuningham was driven to please whichever monarch was ruling at the time, though Christopher Barringer credits simple imprecision, also noting the absence of Norwich Guildhall from the plan. Matthew Champion has proposed that these latter churches existed on the map because the survey took place at least a decade earlier than 1556, supporting this by noting that a tower of the gatehouse at Bishop's Bridge as well as specific sections of the city's defensive walls are depicted despite having been destroyed by this time during Kett's Rebellion in 1549. However, Cuningham may have simply reworked earlier surveys as part of the map. Other churches are absent such as St Bartholomew's on Ber Street and St Swithin's and St Lawrence's on St Benedict's Street, which existed at the time of the map's creation. Round-tower churches like St Benedict's are shown with a square tower. The Church of St Mary in the Field, now Assembly House, is shown as more complex but it is unclear whether its nave is still standing on the map.

=== Streets, areas and open spaces ===
Some areas of the city were in poor condition, with the mayor and aldermen writing of the large number of dilapidated buildings the same year. In The Cosmographical Glasse, Cuningham wrote that the city was "much subject to fiers", though removed the damaged areas of the city from the map entirely. Cuningham removed some streets from the map, particularly the part of Pottergate which sat east of St Lawrence's Lane, which he instead filled with housing. At least 57 metres of buildings here had been destroyed by the 1507 fire, and several plots remained empty at the time of the map's creation, possibly motivating this choice. Ber Street is shown closer to the River Wensum than it really was, which removed the area around King Street that had been particularly damaged by Kett's Rebellion as well as a group of lime-burning kilns between these two streets. These changes also increased the amount of open space near the river and exaggerated the size of St Catherine's croft. It is true that there were many gardens, orchards and open spaces within the city walls, though these were usually hidden from the public's view by enclosing walls and fences. Few of the open spaces depicted on the map were actually common land, as all of the land within the city walls was owned by private interests. Outside the walls, the rolling hills depicted were in reality occupied by a surrounding of smaller settlements including the villages Heigham and Pockthorpe, with the former absent and the latter only partially depicted.
