= Pockthorpe =

Former suburb of Norwich, England

Coordinates: 52.6363°N 1.3024°E

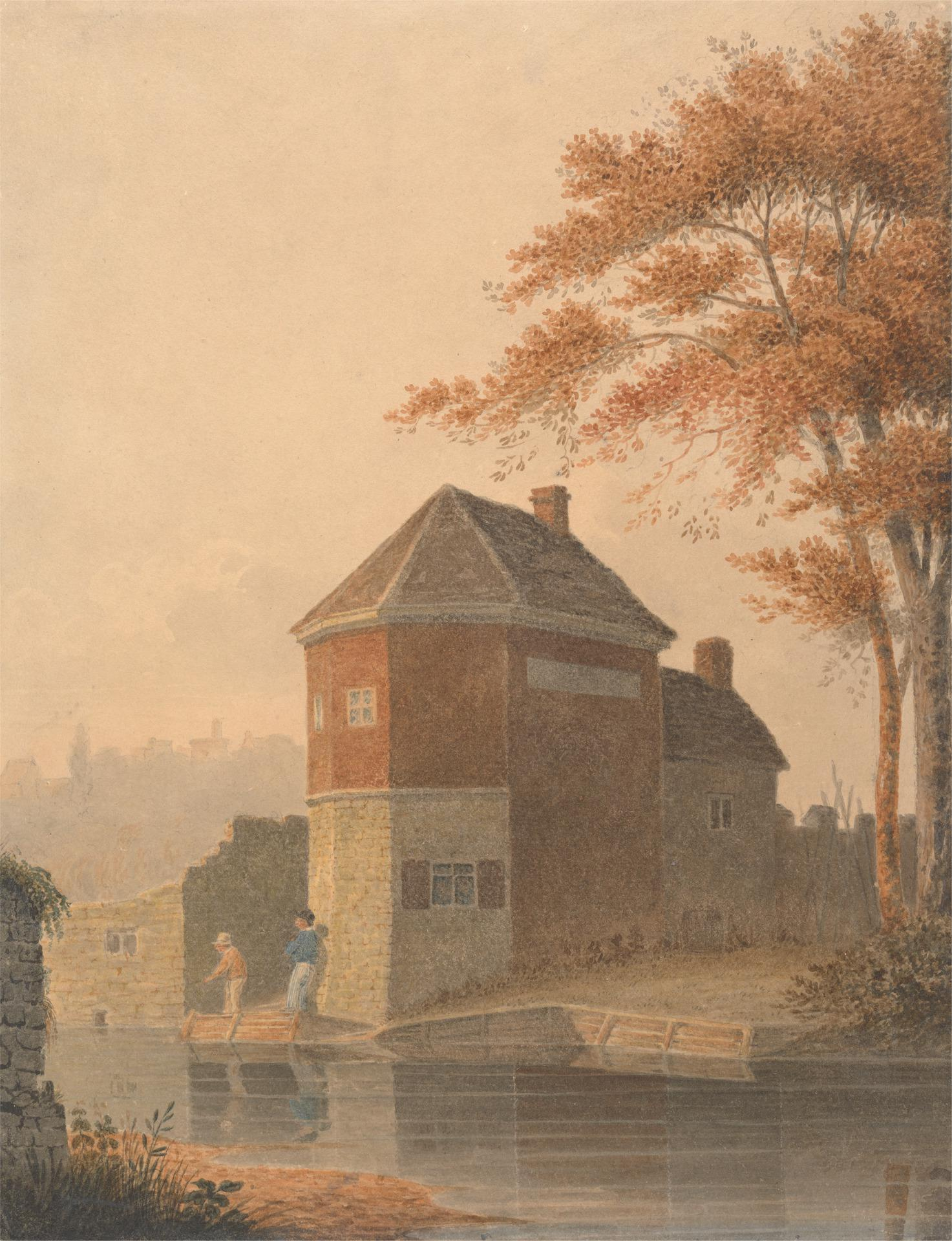
- A watercolour of Pockthorpe by James Sillett (1764–1840)

- Location within Norfolk
- District: Norwich
- Shire county: Norfolk
- Region: East
- Country: England
- Sovereign state: United Kingdom
- Police: Norfolk
- Fire: Norfolk
- Ambulance: East of England

Pockthorpe was a hamlet, extramural suburb, and by the 19th century a slum of the city of Norwich, in Norfolk, England, located between the River Wensum and Mousehold Heath. It was a frequent site of protest to which it lay claim from 1844 under the Pockthorpe Committee until the city took ownership of the heath in 1880. It was subject to slum clearance in the 1930s.

== History ==
Pockthorpe was located immediately outside one of the Norwich city gates and between the River Wensum and the high ground of Mousehold Heath. Its name comes from 'Poka's village', thorpe deriving from the name for smaller outlying Danish villages dependent on a town. Initially a hamlet or village, then, Pockthorpe grew in a ribbon development along its main thoroughfare, which would later be known as Barrack Street.

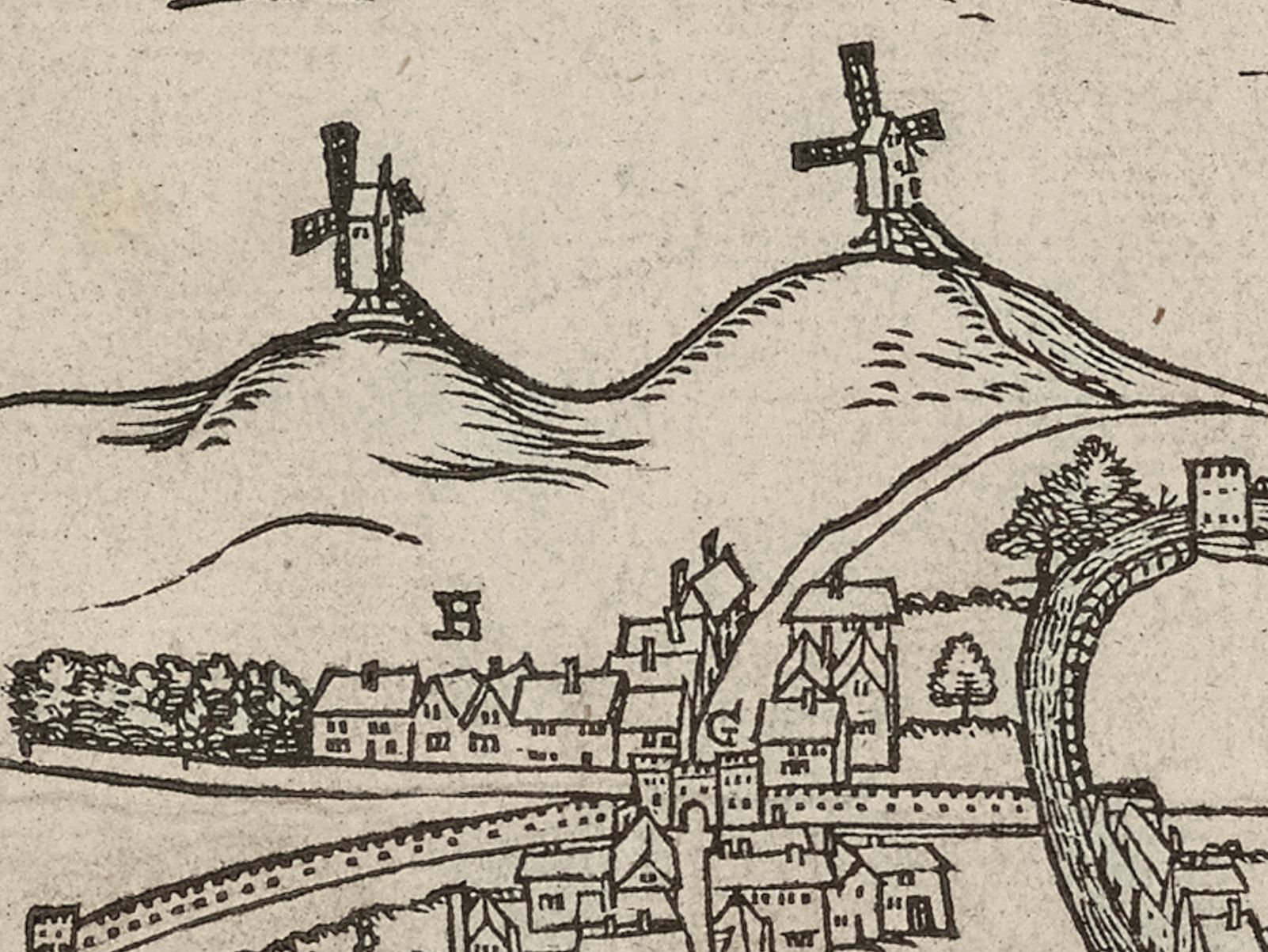
Pockthorpe as depicted in the 1559 Cuningham Prospect, likely smaller than it actually was at the time.

In 1436/37, monks at St Leonard's Priory spent £23 11s 6d on four new tenements in Pockthorpe. William Worcester retired in Pockthorpe in the 15th century. In a 1556 charter, it was brought under the jurisdiction of Norwich. It is somewhat depicted in the 1559 Cuningham Prospect plan of the city at the outer northeastern edge of the city walls.

The settlement was semi-rural during the 17th century. In 1693. Pockthorpe was recorded in the census as being home to 732 people, making it the largest extramural suburb of Norwich. It was relatively respectable during this time as at least two mayors of Norwich lived and died in Pockthorpe in the 1670s and 1680s. In 1671, over 75% of households in Pockthorpe, by this time a suburb of Norwich, were exempt from the city's hearth tax.

=== 18th century–1930: Slum status and campaign for Mousehold Heath ===
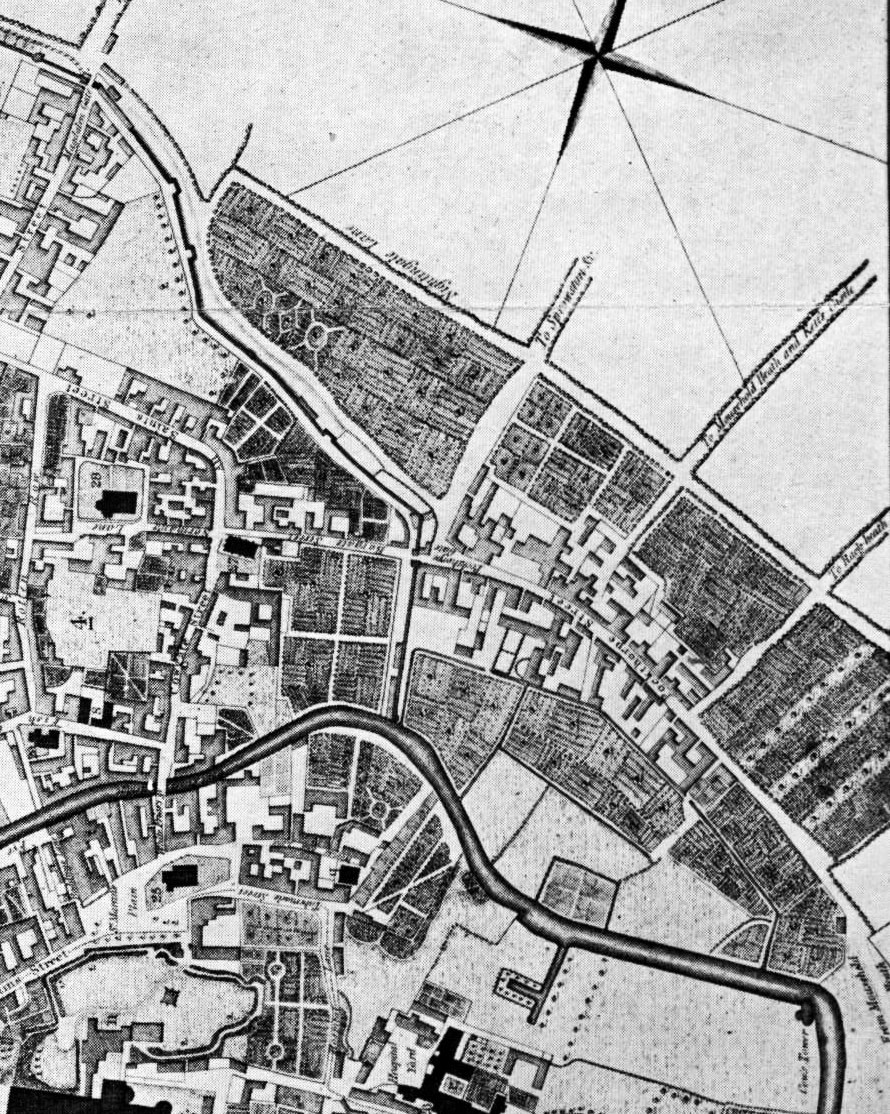
Pockthorpe on Anthony Hochstetter's 1789 map of Norwich

By the early 18th century, a significant number of poor handloom weavers were residents of Pockthorpe, and the area's former wealthier inhabitants had left their larger houses on the main thoroughfare. Population growth in the 18th and 19th centuries led to the construction of jerry-built cottages and animal sheds behind these larger houses, and these formed dense yards and alleyways. From the mid-18th century, the residents of Pockthorpe had an annual custom in which they parodied the city's official mayoral proceedings, electing their own mayor and parading with their own version of the Norwich snapdragon from the city's Guild Day celebrations. This dragon figure is still extant and is present in Norwich Castle Museum. On 20 July 1783, there was an incidence of ball lightning in Pockthorpe; it was reported that "at Norwich, in the hamlet of Pockthorpe, a ball of fire fell on a dwelling-house, and passed through it without doing any material injury".

By the early 19th century, Pockthorpe was seen as the city's most squalid slum. In 1829, one Richard Knockolds of Pockthorpe led a small gang of highly organised weavers, several of whom were also from Pockthorpe, in violent and targeted attacks to protest the recruitment of unskilled weavers from the countryside that resulted from the decline of the city's weaving industry. In 1851, experienced inspector William Lee reported to the General Board of Health that Pockthorpe was "one of horrible places I have ever seen". He noted that there was no lighting or water supply, and that the walls of its overcrowded and semi-derelict houses were situated on a stagnant ditch 0.25 miles (0.40 km) long which was filled with the "refuse from the barracks, containing when full, from 200 to 300 persons, and probably 200 horses". Endemic diseases in Pockthorpe included cholera, influenza, typhoid and whooping cough. The people of Pockthorpe were seen as violent, alcoholic, criminal, and irreligious, and this perception is reflected in the city's court records. During the 19th century, the poorest areas of Norwich, around Pockthorpe, were targeted by the evangelical City Mission Christian movement.

Also during this time, the community of householders in Pockthorpe were known to claim the neighbouring common land of Mousehold Heath as their own, relying on it for fuel, foodstuffs, grazing, quarrying and brickmaking as a central part of their makeshift economy. In 1844, they set up the Pockthorpe Committee in an effort to prevent the exploitation of mineral resources on the heath, filling a vacuum left by the collapse of manorial management early in the century. Pockthorpe residents' claims were viewed negatively, however; an 1855 letter writer to the editorial pages of the Norfolk Chronicle referred to the "aborigines" of Pockthorpe and St Martin Oak being encountered on "our native hills" of the heath. There were years of protracted legal proceedings between the city and the Pockthorpe Committee which ended with the city gaining full ownership of Mousehold Heath in 1880 and subsequently turning it into a People's Park.

On 25 March 1890 the civil parish was abolished to form Norwich.

Particularly during the Edwardian era, Pockthorpe was seen as good copy for local journalism due to its violent reputation. In 1901, a murder of a resident of Pockthorpe's Black Boy Yard occurred, and the Eastern Daily Press covered the murder as "The Pockthorpe Tragedy", calling the yard "notorious". Barry M Doyle has argued that the press's reporting of the murder "built up a picture of slumland and its residents which moved from quiet respectability to stereotypical exploration of the city of darkness", through the creation of "familiar images of wild women, drunken men, immorality, criminality and irregular habits".

In the 1930s, Pockthorpe was subject to a large wave of slum clearance in Norwich.
