= Fires of Norwich (1507) =

Fires in Norwich, England in April and June

On 25 April 1507, a fire broke out on the south bank of the River Wensum in the city of Norwich, England. This was followed by another fire north of the Wensum, in the Norwich Over the Water area, in June the same year. They were the most serious provincial urban fires recorded in early modern England, second in England to the 1666 Great Fire of London.

== Background ==
At the start of the 16th century, Norwich had between 8000 and 9000 inhabitants. From 1404, the city was governed as an independent county under a corporation of a mayor and aldermen, who were advised by a common council elected by the citizenry. The majority of housing in Norwich was constructed with timber framing, clay walling and thatched roofs.

== Fires ==
On 25 April 1507, a fire broke out in the streets and lanes on the south bank of the River Wensum. The fire burned for four days and caused a significant amount of destruction in an arc from the cathedral precinct and Tombland in the east to the parish of St Margaret in the west.

A second fire broke out later the same year, this time in the city's northern Over the Water quarter, a similarly densely occupied set of parishes.

=== Impact ===
18th century Norfolk antiquarian Francis Blomefield wrote that 718 houses were destroyed by the fires, which represents about 40% of Norwich's housing stock at the time. This makes these fires the most serious provincial urban fires recorded in early modern England, second in England to the Great Fire of London in 1666.

Pottergate was one street that received significant damage, with at least 57 buildings here being destroyed. The only buildings that survived the fire were the flint masonry churches and public buildings, as well as stone and brick houses owned by the wealthy merchants of the city. One of the only houses at Elm Hill to survive the April fire was a beguinage built in the early 1400s, now the Briton's Arms.

Poet John Skelton commemorated the 1507 fire with a poetic lament, in which he referenced mythical gods and which includes the lines: "Fulmina sive Iovis sive ultima fata vocabant; Vulcani rapidis ignibus ipsa peris" (Be it Jove's lightning or your ultimate Fate that summoned, by Vulcan's fleet fires do ye perish).

== Rebuilding ==
Urban property owners, particularly those in the cathedral priory, the city corporation and the hospital of St Giles, who relied on rental income, were especially motivated to rebuild the city quickly. Despite this, progress was slow and the cathedral priory almoner's accounts show a strong decline in rents after the fire. Chris King has made the assumption that Norwich's corporation took leadership of rehousing the homeless and beginning the rebuilding process, with the help of the craft guilds of Norwich as well as the charity of the city's religious fraternities and monastic institutions.

Norwich became one of the first two English towns to receive a Rebuilding Statute in 1534. This act of parliament allowed the city corporation to seize unoccupied buildings and dilapidated buildings whose owners refused to rebuild them, and made explicit reference to the impact of the fires of 1507 and the resulting "great decay and voyde ground". This Act has been interpreted by some historians as evidence for long-term housing stock decay in the city after the fires, though others note that the city's claim should not be taken at face value. The other town to initially receive a Rebuilding Statute was the nearby King's Lynn as its harbour had become silted, and this was followed by over 100 English towns in the next decade.

Some historians have argued that building materials and house forms underwent widespread change after the fires, with an increase in combined brick-rubble masonry and timber-framed construction as well as upper storeys, tiled roofs and brick fireplaces and chimneys for houses less wealthy than the elites. This is reflected in surviving 16th-century houses in the city that have these features, as well as identification of this form of rebuilding at archaeological sites across Norwich. Both Cuningham's 1558 prospect map and the Norwich Sanctuary Map of 1541 show many houses with two storeys and chimneys; though these are both simplified representations of the city, they likely portray an idea of what the buildings would generally have looked like. Adam Longcroft has argued that this change in construction "occurred abruptly in the early 1500s", and was a result of the 1507 fires as it gave officials a chance to rebuild with a 'clean slate'; "Nowhere was the process of rebuilding more pronounced than in Norwich, where [...] a new vernacular tradition of flint rubble walling appears to have effectively eradicated an earlier clay building tradition." However, Chris King has noted that houses were being improved in this manner prior to the fires, and also at sites where the fires did not take place such as Alms Lane and Oak Street. He argues that "the fires merely accelerated longer-term transformations in the housing stock". He characterises the 1534 Rebuilding Statute as an effort to gain civic control over dilapidated areas rather than a response to long-term decay.

The result of the fires is not visible in William Cuningham's prospect of Norwich in 1558. For example, Cuningham removed from his map the destroyed part of Pottergate which sat east of St Lawrences Lane, instead filling it with housing. Several plots remained empty at the time of the map's creation, possibly motivating this choice. Much of the area destroyed by the fires had not been rebuilt by the 1560s, though after this the Elizabethan Strangers were responsible for redeveloping large sections of the wards in Norwich Over the Water.

== Archaeological excavations ==
Archaeological excavations in 1973 at 31–51 Pottergate found the remains of a row of small, timber-framed houses that had been destroyed by fire, highly likely in 1507, providing evidence of the material culture of the town at this time. Many objects from inside the houses collapsed into their brick-lined cellars during or after the fire, and this was then backfilled. Objects recovered included metal fittings from furniture, lighting and heating equipment, structural ironwork, locks, and painted window glass. The most complete assemblage of kitchen equipment from the Middle Ages comes from this excavation on Pottergate, which includes a complete copper-alloy tripod skillet, a thin beaten copper bowl, a hanging bowl's iron handle, cauldron hooks, a complete adjustable height suspension ratchet, portions of a rotary spit, and a fire pan, an iron ladle and flesh hook, and a copper-alloy skimmer. There was also evidence of bronzeworking in the form of metalworking tools and off-cuts; many of the discovered bronze vessels and dress fittings could have been goods for sale or repair. Carding combs were also found. A catalogue of these excavated objects was published in 1993, and became influential, encouraging archaeologists to deal with objects by their use and function rather than their component material.
