= Norwich Sanctuary Map =

1541 map of Norwich, England

The Norwich Sanctuary Map is an incomplete map of the city of Norwich, England that intended to show all of the city's places of sanctuary. It is the first surviving example of the involvement of the city in cartography. Though badly damaged, it is one of two surviving maps that resulted from an act limiting and recording sanctuary towns in 1540, the other being of the city of York. It was rediscovered and copied by Reverend William Hudson in 1889.

== Description ==
The original map is large and made of vellum, and is a bird's-eye view of Norwich. The map only shows six churches and Norwich Cathedral, and also shows the line of the city walls, its gates, and five river bridges. It shows the Norwich Guildhall and next to it a pillory. It also shows groups of houses, including those between St Stephen's church and St Peter Mancroft, all of which are marked with chimney stacks; these were not usually common in vernacular buildings at this time. There are no names for the roads, and as far as is known many parts of the map are vacant. A green line demarcates an area that surrounds St Stephen and the tenements between that church and St Peter Mancroft.

== History ==
The map results from the Sanctuaries Act 1540 (32 Hen. 8. c. 12), which significantly modified sanctuary and required mandated commissions to establish boundaries and other details under which sanctuaries were to operate. In February 1541, letters were sent to sanctuary towns, requiring them to designate "such places within the towns [...] as might be convenient for twenty sanctuary men, the least noisome and incommodious for the said towns". The map was thus intended to show all of the city's places of sanctuary. Mayor of Norwich Robert Leche, as well as Sir Roger Townesend, Sir William Paston, and sergeant at law Robert Townesend, submitted it to the King of England.

Thomas Boswell, a painter, was later paid to correct the map; a reference in the city chamberlain's account in 1541 reads:

Paid to Thomas Boswell paynter for correcting of a platte that was set up at this term for the establishing of the Seyntwary [sanctuary] within the cyte according to the statute 6s. 8d.

The original vellum map was held in the Public Record Office of the city, and sustained significant damage. This makes it unclear whether the vacant secitons of the map were actually vacant in this original version. This map was succeeded by William Cuningham's 1558 prospect of the city. In 1889, the map was rediscovered by Reverend William Hudson, who reproduced it.
