= Guild Day =

Abolished festival in Norwich, England (1385–1835)

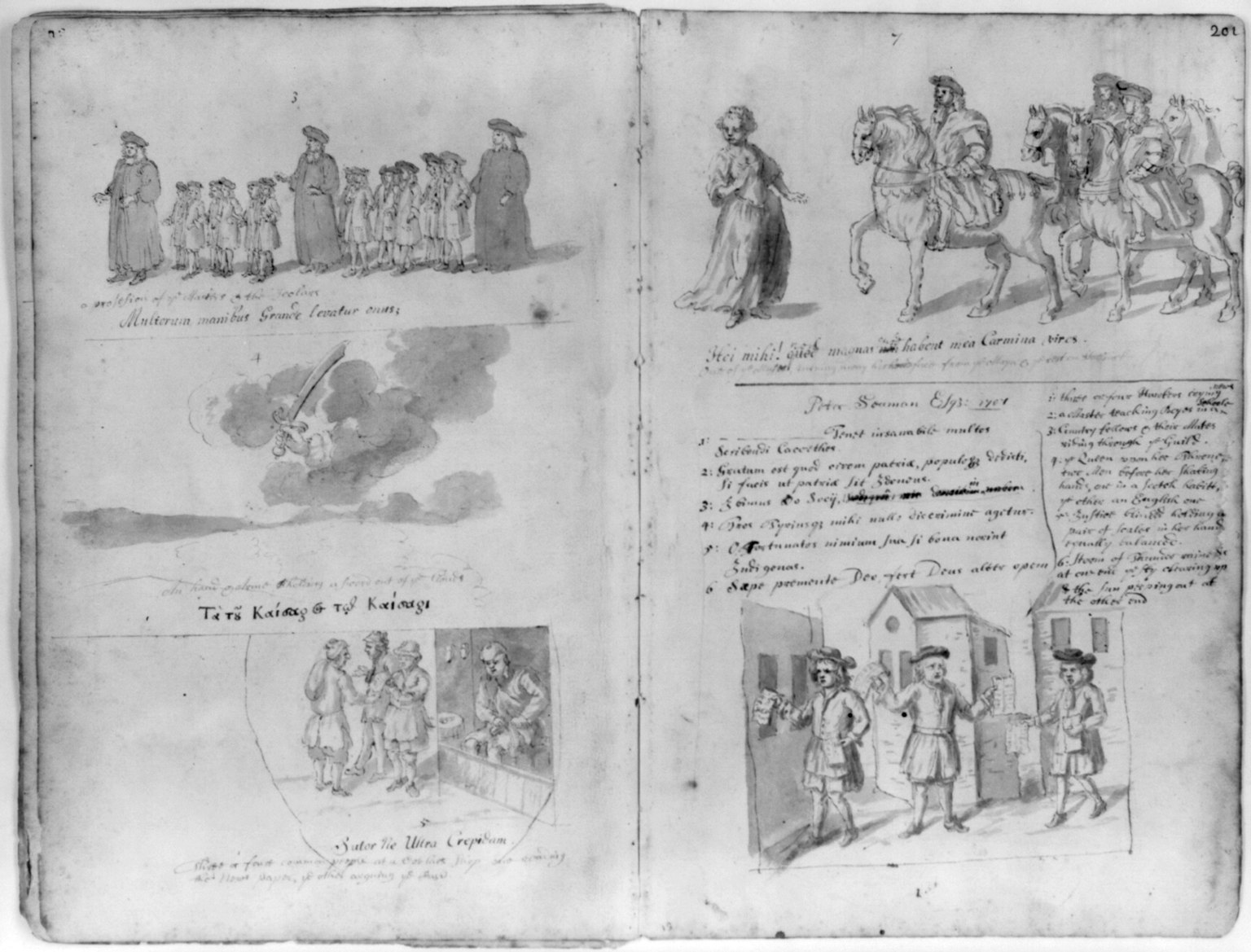
- A page of Thomas Starling's Drawings of annual guild days of Norwich, England, 1705
- Status: Abolished
- Genre: Parade and ceremony
- Frequency: Annual
- Location: Norwich
- Country: England
- Years active: 1385–1835
- Founder: Guild of Saint George

Guild Day was an annual ceremony and festival held in the city of Norwich, England from its establishment by its namesake the Guild of Saint George in 1385 to its abolition in 1835. There are extensive records of the event's history, though the rituals associated with it changed over time.

From its establishment in 1385 it was largely a civic religious parade that took place on Saint George's Day from the St Peter Mancroft church to Norwich Cathedral, usually featuring a dramatisation of the legendary fight between Saint George and a dragon figure, as well as a representation of Lady Margaret from 1530.

During and after the Reformation, it began to take on a secular purpose. Surviving the Chantries Act 1547, the Company and Citizens of Saint George significantly reduced the celebration for the duration of the reign of Edward VI. The Company fully dropped its depictions of George and Margaret in 1559 under the Protestant Elizabeth I while keeping the dragon later known as Snap, and moved the festival's date multiple times before landing on the Tuesday before midsummer, the day of the yearly inauguration of the new Mayor of Norwich; Guild Day thus became a celebration of this inauguration, bolstering the continuity of civic authority in the city. The event saw a period of religious turbulence during and after the English Civil War.

Guild Day continued after the dissolution of the Company of Saint George in 1732, though was abolished under the Municipal Corporations Act 1835. Objects from Guild Day reside in Norwich Castle Museum, and drawings of the events are held by the US Library of Congress.

== History ==
=== 1385–1547: Establishment and formation of traditions ===
In the year of its founding, The religious Guild of Saint George in Norwich, founded to honour the saint, venerate God, and pray for members of the guild both living and dead as well as for men in the King's service, established the ceremony in 1385, giving Guild Day its namesake. Douglas Ezzy, Gary Easthope and Victor Morgan have suggested that Norwich likely drew on ideas to create Guild Day from the mayor's pageant in London.

The religious rituals that made up Guild Day varied significantly over time. During its first centuries, its ceremonies began during evensong in Norwich Cathedral the day prior to the main event, usually on 22 April. Guild Day itself usually happened on the 23 April which is Saint George's Day, or in May when the usual date coincided with Holy Week or Easter Week. Leading the procession on the day, from St Peter Mancroft church in the western part of Norwich, to Norwich Cathedral, a man would carry a wooden sword featuring a handle in the shape of a dragon's head, usually followed by a standard bearer, musicians, torch bearers and holy water bearers, as well as the City Waits, cantors from the Cathedral, and city and guild officials. From as early as the first years of the 15th century, the centrepiece of the procession at the time was a representation of Saint George on horseback who wore full armour, accompanied by a dragon figure. A dramatised battle would play out between the two, and following this the dragon would not be permitted to enter the cathedral, according to some scholars instead remaining outside on a "dragon stone" after having been vanquished. The Guild members would then hear mass in the cathedral at its Saint George altar or chapel before joining a feast. The Guild would return to the cathedral later in the day to pray for the souls of its dead members and benefactors. The next morning, additional religious services were held at Norwich Cathedral and guild officers were elected for the next year at a predetermined location.

The Guild received its charter in 1417. It is argued by Benjamin McRee that factional infighting in Norwich in the 1430s "added a new, partisan layer of meaning to the symbolism of [the Guild's] annual procession", when a bloc led by Mayor Thomas Wetherby and his supporters, many of them Guild members, lost and then regained office with the support of Earl of Suffolk William de la Pole, also a guild member. In 1452, the city government effectively amalgamated with the Guild of Saint George, and as part of this deal all city officers gained admission to the Guild, including past political enemies of Wetherby. After this point, the church was represented in the parade by around 24 priests, half of whom would be dressed in red copes and the other half in white, as well as chanting clerks from Norwich Cathedral. Following the 1452 merge, Saint George nor the dragon would appear in the parade for 15 years; Muriel C. McClendon has argued that adversaries of Wetherby within the Guild possibly wanted to suppress the message of an urban reliance on outsiders that they believed the legend inculcated. The two characters returned to the parade in 1467, the year of the death of the Guild's last leading adversary to Wetherby.

By the 16th century, Norwich's civic elite including its Mayor, aldermen, and some Common Council members, formed the centre of the Guild of Saint George's membership alongside gentry, aristocrats and ecclesiastical notables. In 1530, a representation of Lady Margaret portrayed by a Guild member, occasionally referred to in sources as 'The Lady', 'The Maid', or 'The Margaret' and dressed in red or purple, was added to the procession, riding behind Saint George. They rode horses decorated with ribbons and laces. Philip Butterworth has put forward that during this time the dragon figure may have been allowed to weave in and out of the parade to cause fear and amusement, though this assertion is based on later accounts of the parade. After some time, the full armour and weapons usually worn by the Saint George character in the procession's early years were instead carried for him by attendants.

=== 1547–1642: Reformation changes ===
In 1547 during the Reformation, the dissolution of the chantries, religious fraternities and other charitable and educational foundations was ordered by an act of Parliament under Edward VI. While this led to the end of many Saint George's Day celebrations across England, it did not affect the Guild in Norwich aside from causing it to re-found itself as the Company and Citizens of Saint George, as a charter granted to the Guild's members in 1417 by Henry V had made it a permanent body. The name change displayed a rejection of the doctrine of purgatory, and thus signalled a transition of the feast day from a civic religious ceremony to a ceremony with a secular purpose. After 1547, members of the Company stopped playing Saint George, Margaret, or the dragon, and prayers for its deceased members were halted. For the rest of the reign of Edward VI, the celebration was significantly reduced to an evensong service on the day prior, a divine service and banquet on the feast day, and a sermon and election of officers on the third day. In 1550, the Company sold some possessions including those that had been used in its pre-Edwardian parades.

In March 1555, now under the reign of Mary I, the Company and Citizens of Saint George made the decision to return to the commemoration of Saint George's Day as it had "twenty years past," prior to the Reformation changes. But, in May they instead decided against this, resolving to keep the feast on the Sunday after Trinity "upon divers considerations" despite Mary's restoration of the ritual calendar to its pre-Reformation format. They did, however, return their name to the original Guild of Saint George.

At a council meeting in May 1559, following the death of Mary I and the accession of the Protestant Elizabeth I as Queen the previous year, the Guild adopted the name "Company and Fellowship of Saint George", and chose to remove both Saint George and Margaret from the procession. They did however resolve to keep the dragon; "but for pastime the dragon to come in and show himself as in other years". This satisfied Protestant critics of the celebration. Muriel C. McClendon argues that from this point on, the members of the Company themselves were framed as the heroes against the dragon instead of the now absent Saint George, though Gervasse Rosser has argued that from this point the dragon embodied both roles. The feast of Saint George was again officially abrogated in 1561, though Norwich's Guild survived this and the annual ceremony persisted.

In April 1574, members of the Company again changed the date of the celebration, this time to the Sunday before Midsummer. By this time, the event was commonly known as "the feast of the mayor, shreves and company." In 1584, the celebration's date was moved a third time to the Tuesday after the Feast of Saint Peter the Apostle, continuing as a June festival.

=== 1619–1642: As a celebration of the new Mayor of Norwich ===
During the early 17th century, the ceremony became entirely fused with the installation of the Mayor of Norwich, which was already taking place on the Tuesday before Midsummer. The new purpose of Guild Day became to celebrate the inauguration of a new mayor of the city. The mayoral handover made the civic authority fragile, and so the pomp and ceremony was used to emphasise the authority of magistracy and the unity and continuity of the civic body. In 1619, the accounts of the Company record payments for painting the dragon by then known as Snap, as well as payments for gilding and painting a figure of Saint George, as "work done for the city"; the Norwich city chamberlain paid for the work on this figure which was used intermittently between 1619 and 1632. The chamberlain also took over the maintenance of the dragon from the early 1620s. Also around this time, a fool known as Dick Fool, as well as a pair of whifflers who had the job of clearing a path in the crowd for the dragon, were added to the procession.

This version of the ceremony included decoration of the town, several processions, a large feast for the elite, and entertainment of the masses with fireworks and sideshows. In preparation for the events, houses were newly painted. In some cases, plasterwork was marked out to resemble dressed stone and boughs of greenery were brought into the streets. Rushes were strewn about in Norwich Cathedral, and contemporary observers noted that streets were decorated with flags, portraits and tapestries. Cannons, bells, trumpets and fireworks were used. Citizens dressed in their best clothes for the occasion. The new purpose of Guild Day became to celebrate the inauguration of a new mayor of the city. The mayoral handover made the civic authority fragile, and so the pomp and ceremony was used to emphasise the authority of magistracy and the unity and continuity of the civic body.

Citizens turned out in thousands to watch the procession to and from the cathedral. For the procession, a sword that had been presented to the city by Henry V was carried before the mayor. He was then inducted into office in a ceremony at the Guildhall, taking three oaths; one being his oath as Mayor which was a self-dedication to the city, and the other two directly to the monarch. There was an extensive use of Latin; ordinances from the 16th century stipulated that each year, the high master of the Norwich School was to appoint some of the school's boys to deliver "a pitthye and short oracion in Latyn comending Justice and Obedyence" on Guild Day. Boys at the school also composed verses for the event which were inspired by ancient texts, often in English with Latin titles. Several of the orations from the ordinances' continued observance in the early 18th century exist at the Norfolk Record Office.

=== 1642–1732: Religious turbulence ===
During the English Civil War, there was an attack on Guild Days and festivals, and the dragon was temporarily banned from the procession during this war as well as during the Interregnum, though the Guild Day feast and a scaled-down version of the procession continued through the 1640s and 1650s. During the Guild Day sermon on 22 June 1647, which was delivered by John Carter, the Presbyterian minister of St Peter Mancroft, Carter scolded the city magistrates for attempting to silence godly ministers and for having supported Bishop of Norwich Matthew Wren during the 1630s. Following the riot and explosion known as the Great Blow, The Rump Parliament passed an Act to regulate Norwich elections, which declared that those implicated in the riot were to be disenfranchised and debarred from office. Despite this, in June 1649, the Company of Saint George resolved unanimously that those who had signed the petition in support of Mayor John Utting that had sparked the riot should still be able to bear the feast. They decided this because they found that the Act did not apply to the Company. Later under the reign of Charles II, dissenters to the Crown were allowed to serve as feast-makers. Snap returned to the processions after the Stuart Restoration, remaining part of them into the 19th century.

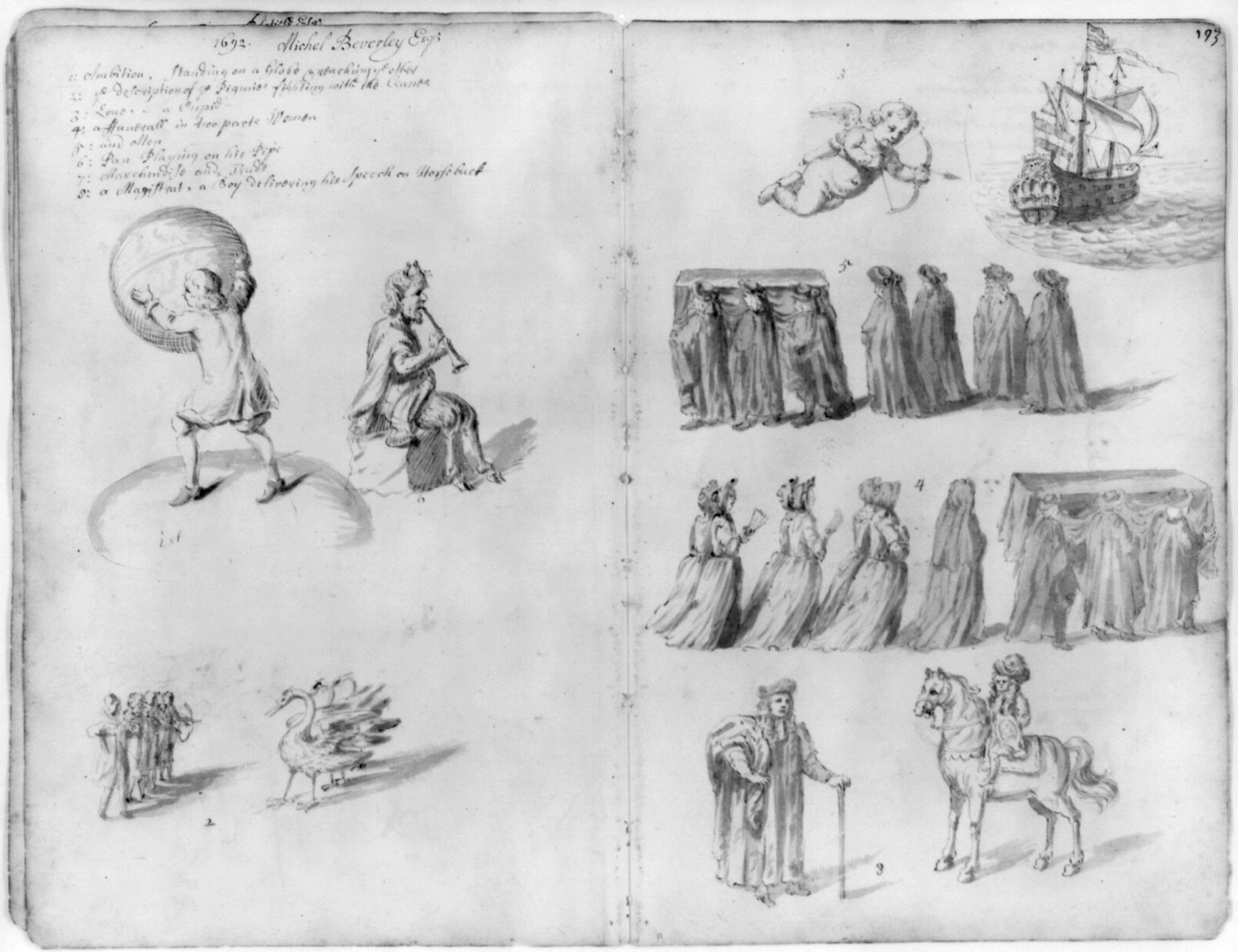
Starling's depictions of Guild Day from 1705

In the early 1700s, the Company of Saint George continued to organise the Guild Day procession and feast. On Guild Day in 1710, the picture of the High Church preacher Dr Sacheverell was displayed between the pictures of Charles I and Charles II, "with a very curious bower over his head, made of roses". On another Guild Day in 1715, the new mayor who was a strong Tory decorated his house with pictures of Sacheverell and Queen Anne on one side and William III and Oliver Cromwell on the other, displaying his preference for the former side. In 1723, the usher of the Norwich School was ordered by the court to present the speeches delivered on the previous Guild Day, and after this was commanded to submit the speeches to the mayor in advance. By 1731, there was a significant financial burden on the leading citizens of the city, requiring reform.

=== 1732–1835: Post-Company of Saint George ===
In 1732, the Company of Saint George was dissolved, though Guild Day survived this as did its inclusion of the dragon. At the 1780 Guild Day in Norwich, parson Woodforde attended and wrote in his diary that he "walked thro' St Giles's Street [...] the Street was full of People [...] The Market Place was also full of People and quite down to St Andrew's Hall".

=== 1835–early 20th century: Abolition and anti-establishment parody ===
Guild Day was formally abolished in 1835, as a result of the Municipal Corporations Act 1835.

Some elements of the ceremony survived as an anti-establishment parody until the early 20th century; in an annual custom and inversion ritual dating from the mid-18th century, the residents of Norwich's slum suburb of Pockthorpe parodied the city's official mayoral proceedings by electing their own mayor and parading in the streets with their own version of the snapdragon.

== Norwich Snapdragon ==
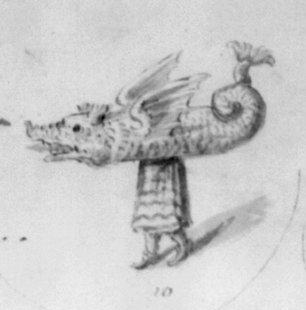
Starling's 1705 drawing of the Norwich Snap Dragon of the time

There is recorded use of performing dragon figures in the Guild Day parade from the early 15th century onward, where such a figure is recorded accompanying the representation of Saint George at the parade. Their main purpose was to collect money during the procession. Typical Norwich dragons were carried using straps over the operators' shoulders and puppeted from inside, and would have featured a skirt below the body with its own dragon legs painted on, hiding the real legs of the operator. While there are no surviving pictorial representations of the early Norwich dragons and thus no way to verify how consistent these dragons were in terms of design, records of payments suggest their specific features. Gervasse Rosser has argued that, with the figure of Saint George removed from the event from 1559, the dragon embodied the ideas of both danger and protection.

In the early 17th century, the dragon became known as Snap, signalling a more light-hearted and less sinister perception of the dragon figures than in their earlier years, as well as a loss of its allegorical significance to the Saint George and the Dragon legend. A later-19th century rhyme, "Snap, snap, steal a boys cap, give him a penny and he’ll give it back", developed. Snap fell out of use in 1835 when Guild Day was abolished.

=== Payment records ===
In the 16th century Saint George's Guild Surveyor' Account Rolls, there is an extensive series of transactions to pay for the operation and maintenance of a dragon for the parade, many of which correspond with extant dragons from centuries since but do not confirm that the dragon was of the same design. These include a payment in the 1533–34 record "to the man that made the dragon ij s vj d And payed ffor Canwas for the dragon vj d." The dragon was seemingly remade in 1535, for which one Roose Steyner was paid 5 shillings. There was a transaction in the 1541–42 record to "Moraunt ffor clothe to couer the dragon", as well as "to Moton steyner ffor newe peyntyng of the dragon". In the 1542–43 accounts, the bearer of the dragon was paid twelve pence. Payments for "a bag ffor money" correspond to the dragon's fiance-collecting purpose. The Guild bought "DCC naylez ffor the dragon" for "steyneng of the dragons hede". Mention of "lynen clothe ffor the neke of the dragon" was likely to allow for flexibility in the movement of the figure's neck. The Saint George Guild Accounts for 1581–82 also record payments for "ij yardes dimidium of Sultwiche for the Dragon", referring to a course cloth known as soultwiche, likely stretched over the dragon's frame. One Henry Radoe was paid "for A hoope of yron for the dragon and for naylles". "A Couper" was also paid "for putting in hoopes to sett it owt in the bellye". There were payments for "A furren Pole" or "staff" in various years, possibly for manipulating the dragon's back and head, and for lines, likely to connect to dragon's head and wings to the pole for their manouveure.

== Legacy ==
Many of the artefacts used in the ceremony survive and are now in the keeping of the Norfolk Museums Service. This includes emblematic trenchers that were likely used at the feast, speech-boys' cardboard shields, staves, and processional banners, a figure of Snap the dragon, and civic regalia. Versions of the dragon still exist today and have been exhibited in Norwich Castle Museum, including one named 'Old Snap' at its 1963 exhibition The Growth of a City. Others in the museum include the mock dragon from Pockthorpe, another mock dragon from Costessey. One of the extant dragons, created in 1795, measures 4.5 metres (15 ft) from nose to tail. The Library of Congress holds a compendium of drawings by contemporaries of the Norwich Guild Days.

== Historical analysis ==
Benjamin McRee has detailed that the re-enactment of the legend of Saint George was initially "a unifying display of pride in the wake of England's recent military victories in France" in the 15th century. Analysing the celebration prior to the Reformation, Muriel C. McClendon has stated that Guild Day "combined the veneration of a popular saint with an impressive display of the civic leadership", and that the use of the Cathedral "highlighted the close connection between the secular government and religion, suggesting a sacred dimension to magisterial rule." Ezzy, Easthope and Morgan have argued that after the Reformation, Guild Day was a way in which Norwich city officials could retain power; the Reformation had weakened the power of the idea of sacred ritual, and the secular elite lacked the physical force to justify their authority. Thus, they have argued that civic ritual was a way in which these officials could maintain their control of the city, using the ceremony to create a liminal state with loud noise, decorations, and transgression of the town/country boundary.
