= Norwich women's grain protest =

1532 protest in Norwich

On 20 July 1532, a group of women seized sacks of grain from various men in the English city of Norwich, took them to market cross in the centre of the city, and sold them below the price set by city magistrates. Ten of the women were sentenced by the mayor's court to be "tied at the cart's tail and whipped surely with whips around the market", though six of these women instead paid a fine.

The event was a part of an intense period of sustained public confrontation with authority in the city. The clerk of the mayor's court, where twelve of the women were tried, described the event as an "insurreccion [...] of women". Christian D. Liddy has argued that the use of the word "insurrection" here simply means "rising up".

== Background ==
Though there had been crises concerning food shortages already, with the first real crisis year taking place in 1527, in 1532 marked a second year of crisis, marked by a dearth of grain. Grain prices were higher as a result. Magistrates had endeavoured to make grain more widely available by enforcing a high price. In February, the mayor and aldermen carried out an audit of all the "greynes" in the city, and a Norwich mercer, Robert Palmer, agreed to bring 60 combs of wheat to the marketplace which his servants would sell under the market price every Saturday in instalments of 10 combs. In May and June, two citizens, one being a grocer, agreed to each sell weekly consignments of wheat in the city’s marketplace, at the going rate.

== Events ==
On 20 July 1532, one Elizabeth Barret, a widow who would later tell of the events in her deposition, saw the servant of "one Hede" (likely William Hede who had negotiated with the mayor and aldermen to sell wheat in the marketplace) beat a woman for measuring corn by the market cross in the city. Though Barret did not know the woman, she went to her aid and "bete the seid servaunt". Berret joined the group "for pitie" of the woman that she had seen being physically attacked. She then left the market to return later.

Meanwhile, a group of women seized corn owned by various men as it was transported into the city. This included the malt owned by mercer Palmer which the women took from Conesford.

Upon Barret's return to the marketplace, she saw "one moder [mother] Perne and other women" enter the market with a cart carrying sacks of wheat. These sacks were placed in a heap near the market cross. The women decided on the public price of corn amongst themselves, as well as how they would sell it. Barret aided in spreading out the sacks for public sale at the cross. and then sold the grain below the price set by city magistrates. This appears to be an effort to combat the higher prices of grain at the time, though was a contradiction and supplantation of the authority of Norwich's mayor. Agnes Haddon, another later deponent, bought some of the wheat and went home. The names of around 40 women who took part in this are known. Of the twelve women who appeared by name in the later deposition resulting from the event, at least five were wives. At least eight of the wives lived in the ward of South Conesford. Three married couples also took part; the husbands in these couples were the only men to do so.

After this, Barret and four other women went to drink together "at Thomas Sylam", likely the name of the owner of an alehouse or a householder. One of the women sought to have the proceeds of the sale given to the seargeant-at-mace who oversaw the market, which would mean the money would not be considered stolen.

On 21 July, a small group of women visited Haddon at her home. These included Joan Norton of the parish of St Stephen, another unnamed person from the same parish, and a woman who had sold wheat the day prior. This group, bringing Haddon with them, then went to "Oldeman house in Conesford" to speak to Agnes Oldeman in order to ask what they should do with the money they had collected from selling the wheat. Agnes's husband Henry was also present, and interjected to tell them to hand the money over to the mayor, rebuking them for selling the wheat in the way they had done. The women spoke for several hours until after evensong. They then met with "one Skynner wiff of Coslany" and nine or ten other women whose names are not known. It was suggested that they go to help women who had been confined in the Guildhall for selling wheat, though Agnes and her companions declined. The same day, James Cootes said to a butcher and two other men in the house of Robert Thakker's widow on Ber Street that he would be displeased if his wife did not join the women and said he would defend his wife whould she come into physical harm.

== Trial and sentences ==
Twelve of the women, the "principall offenders", were brought to the mayor's court in early August 1532. They were charged of the "sellyng of dyuers mennes cornes ayenst ther willes and settyng of prises therof at ther aun mendes [own minds] contrary to such prises as the mair of the said Citie hadde sett bifore that tyme." They were not represented by men and were considered accountable for their misconduct. In their depositions the women did not cite fears of provision, possibly garnering sympathy from the court. Agnes Haddon stated that she had followed the price that the other women present had set. The clerk of the court labelled the episode as an "insurreccion within the Citie of Norwich of women", and the magistrates reprimanded them for taking and selling the wheat "at their own minds." Christian D. Liddy has argued that the clerk's use of the word 'insurreccion' was less of a patriarchal use of the term, and should instead be translated literally from the Latin intransitive verb insurgere, to simply mean 'rising up'. The court convicted them of "selling of divers men's corns against their wills and setting of prices thereof at their own minds contrary to such prices as the mayor of the city had set before that time."

Ten of the women, the ringleaders, were sentenced to be "tied at the cart's tail and whipped surely with whips around the market", the place where they had committed the crime. One, Alianora Young, was infirm and so was not sentenced. She was one of the six of the sentenced ten who had their sentences commuted to a fine, though the remaining four were punished as the court initially sentenced.
