= St Miles Bridge =

Bridge in Norwich, England

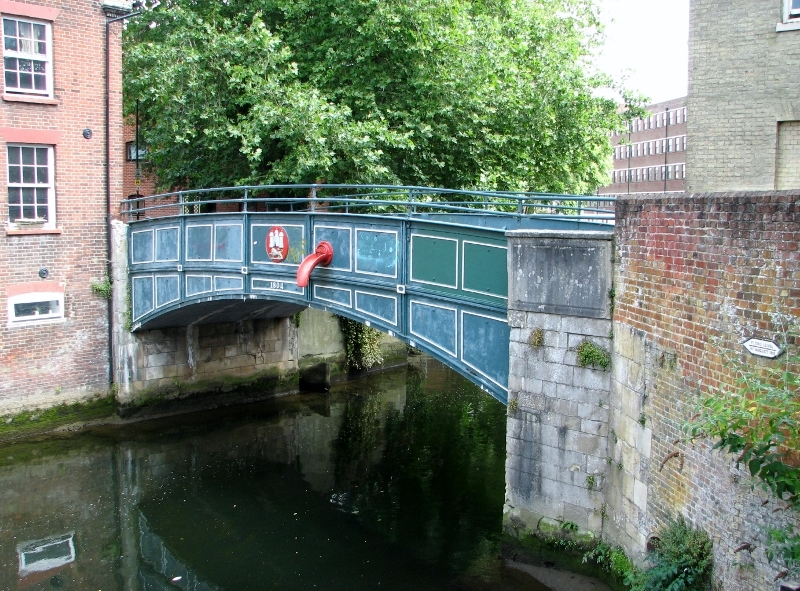
- St Miles Bridge in 2018
- Coordinates: 52.63175°N 1.29075°E
- OS grid reference: TG 22789 08861
- Carries: Coslany Street
- Crosses: River Wensum
- Locale: Norwich, England
- Next upstream: New Mills
- Next downstream: Duke's Palace Bridge

Characteristics
- Material: Cast iron and stone

History
- Designer: James Frost
- Built: 1804

Statistics

Listed Building – Grade II
- Designated: 5 June 1972
- Reference no.: 1051286

Location
- Interactive map of St Miles Bridge

St Miles Bridge, also known as Coslany Bridge, is a grade II listed cast iron bridge with stone abutments over the River Wensum in Norwich, England, carrying Coslany Street. It is the earliest iron bridge in Norwich, and is thought to be the oldest bridge of its type in East Anglia.

== History ==
This bridge is depicted on William Cuningham's map of Norwich drawn up in 1558.

In 1804, the bridge was designed by James Frost, of St Faith's Lane, at a cost of £1,100. It was some of Frost's early work. In the Norwich Mercury, the novel principles of the bridge's construction were praised. It carried the traffic of the adjacent brewery, which is now defunct, as well as traders on Coslany Street.

In 1912, the bridge survived a large flood in Norwich which reached the bridge's parapets. It was later restored, and paved in brick. Since, the area has largely become residential, with the bridge's use being restricted to pedestrians and cyclists.

== Architecture ==
The bridge made up of a single cast iron span of 36 ft 2 in (11 m), supported by four cast iron ribs that split up 5 bolted sections with solid spandrels. It has simple parapet rails and panelled sides, with stone abutments. The centre panel on the outer face of both parapets features the city arms on embossed plaques, with the date 1804 cast marked at the centre of the arch. The west parapet has a projecting spout for hoses.

== See also ==
- St Crispin's Bridge, another iron bridge in Norwich
