= Norwich city walls =

Defensive structure encircling Norwich, England

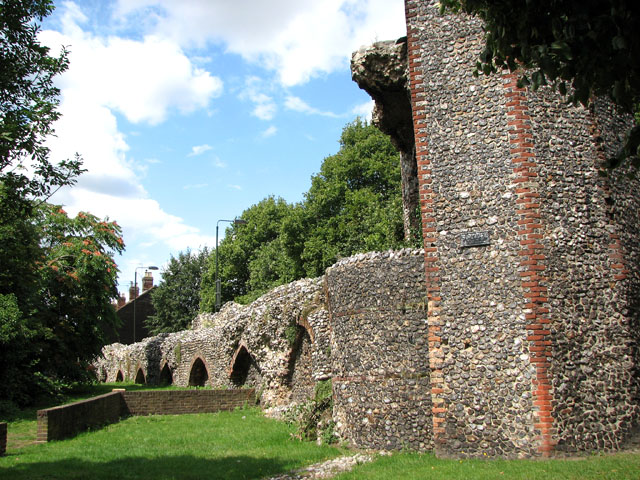
- Interactive map of Norwich city walls
- Location: Norwich, England
- OS grid reference: TG 2317 0862

History
- Built: 1294–1343

The Norwich city walls are a set of medieval defensive walls, constructed over a period from 1294 until 1343, whose ruins surround most of the inner city of Norwich in England. Extending for 2.5 miles (4.0 km), the flint walls incorporated around 40 towers, such as the Boom Towers, Cow Tower and Black Tower, as well as 12 gates including the St Stephen's, Conisford and Bishop's gates. The area enclosed by the walls and River Wensum is larger than the City of London.

Over the subsequent centuries, the walls were subject to some conflict, sustaining damage from Kett's Rebellion in 1549. In 1556, the territory of Norwich was expanded beyond the city walls and they fell out of defensive use over time. Many of the gates were demolished in the 18th and 19th centuries, with most meeting this fate in 1793 and 1794.

== History ==
=== Defensive ditches and banks ===
The earliest evidence of a physical defensive barrier in Norwich is an Anglo-Scandinavian ditch and bank to the north of the River Wensum, likely created around 900–950 AD. This ran north from Colegate, up the present day St George's Street and Cowgate, and south along what is today Whitefriars. A similar line may have followed the course of the Peacock and Blackfriars Streets. Another bank and ditch was created in 1253, likely featuring a timber palisade and following what would later become the line of the city walls.

=== Construction ===
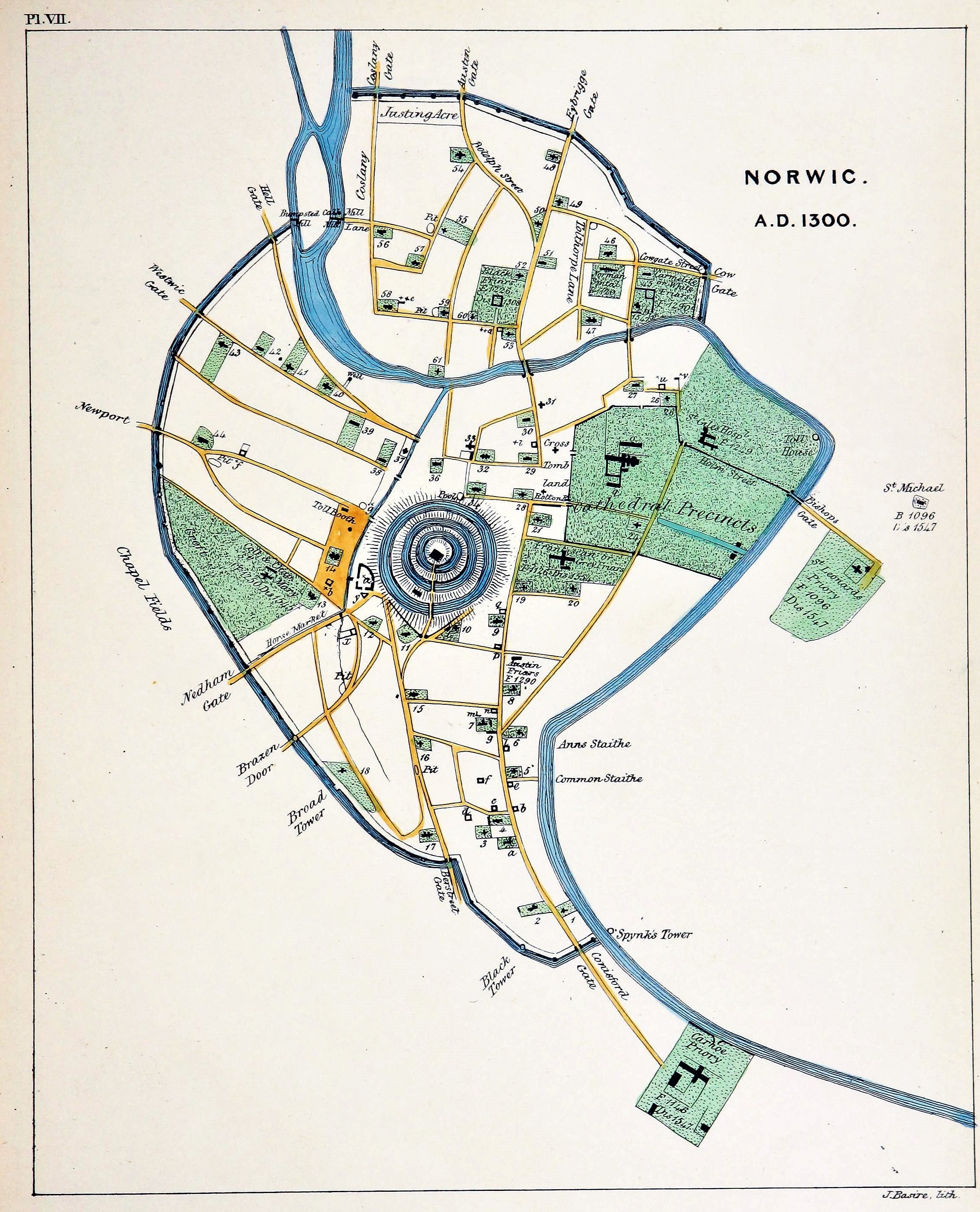
A map of Norwich circa 1300, with labelled gates and towers, published 1847

The full masonry of the Norwich city walls were built from 1294 until 1343. Extending for 2.5 miles (4.0 km), and at a height of about 20 feet (6.1 m), the walls may have required an estimated 40,000 cubic metres of material to build. The walls surround the town apart from where the River Wensum protected the city on the east side and in the north-west. They featured an inner arcade which supported a wall-walk, as well as brick battlements. Outside the walls was a ditch 20 feet (6.1 m) deep and 60 feet (18 m) wide. They were largely flint-built with the support of large amounts of mortar, as well as brick under the arcades. This masonry meant that the construction needed to take place within shutters, with each section being around 20 inches (51 cm) high, layered on top of the previous section once it had set.

The walls were initially intended to be funded by murage grants from the crown, though wealthy citizen Robert Spynk's funding also contributed; he donated thirty springalds in 1342 to be mounted on the walls. These, according to the city, were intended to resist attacks from enemies of the King. The Norwich Domesday Book lists several acquisitions by the city during the 1330s and 40s which seem directly connected to the project of the city walls, being adjacent to the walls or situated next to the Conisford and Pockthorpe Gates.

=== Conflicts, repairs and expansion ===
By 1385, Norwich's artillery included around 50 expensive guns which were distributed around the gates and towers. In January 1443, a procession around the Norwich city walls by a crowd led by John Gladman took place following their theft of the common seal from Norwich Guildhall, which was in response to a then upcoming arbitration between the City of Norwich and several of its ecclesiastical neighbours that was to be sealed by the Earl of Suffolk. Aldermen of the city were often patrons toward repairing the wall and gates in the late 15th and early 16th century; in 1498, scrivener and notary Stephen Brian left £10 to repair the walls in St Stephen's ward, and in her 1504 will, Katherine Bewfield set aside £5 for the upkeep of the walls.

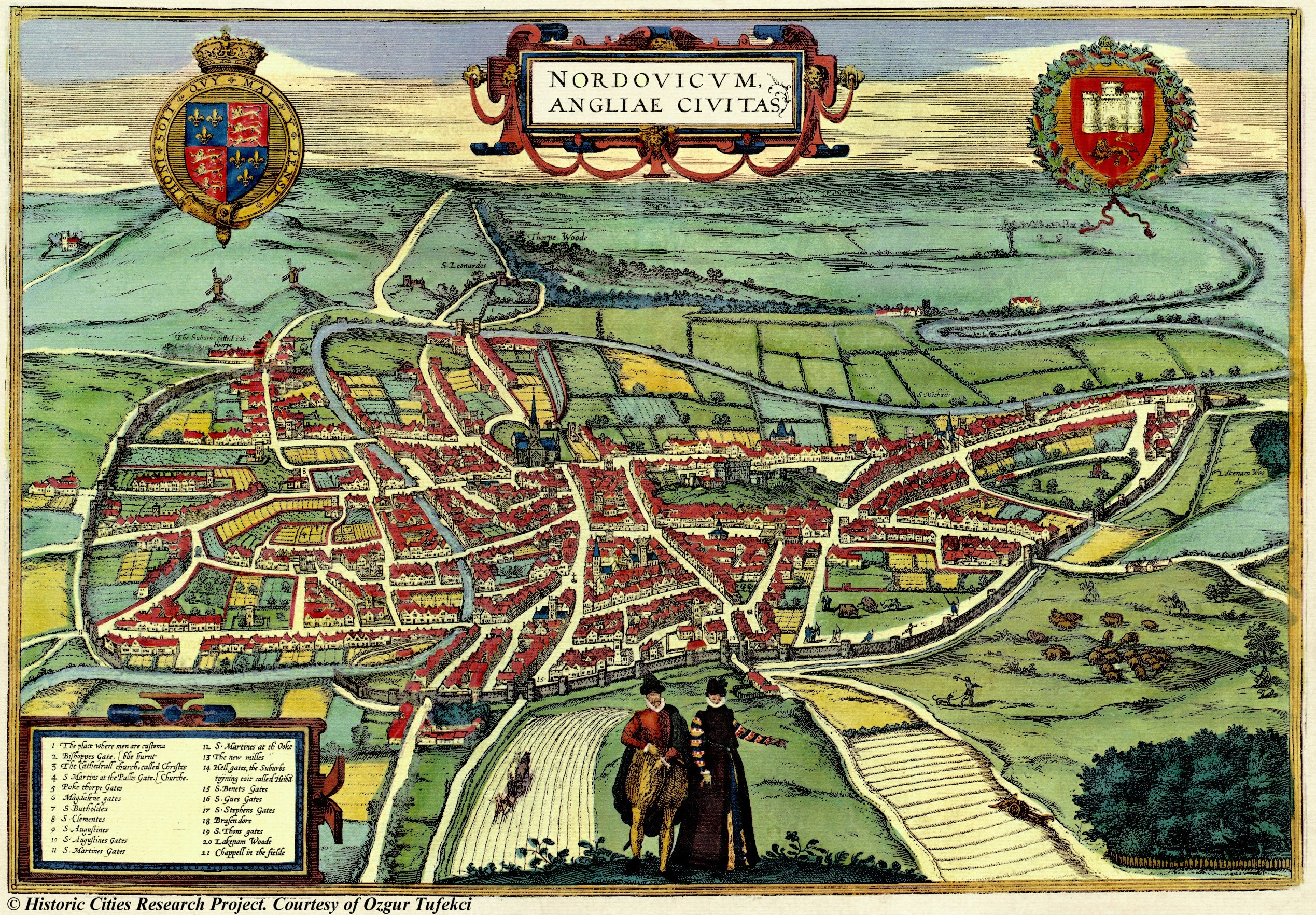
A map of Norwich published 1572–1617, depicting the city walls

In 1556, Norwich's 1404 charter was renegotiated, expanding the territory under its jurisdiction beyond the city walls. No houses were built outside the walls until around 1779–89. Over time, the walls fell out of serious use and became monuments, valued for their picturesque character and historical interest.

== Towers ==
The walls included around 40 towers, which were largely circular or semi-circular or occasionally semi-polygonal in footprint. Most of the towers were completed by 1347, and by around 1350, all of them had been built. This list sorts the notable towers starting from the north-east corner of the Norwich city walls at the River Wensum, and continues counter-clockwise.

=== Bull Close Tower ===
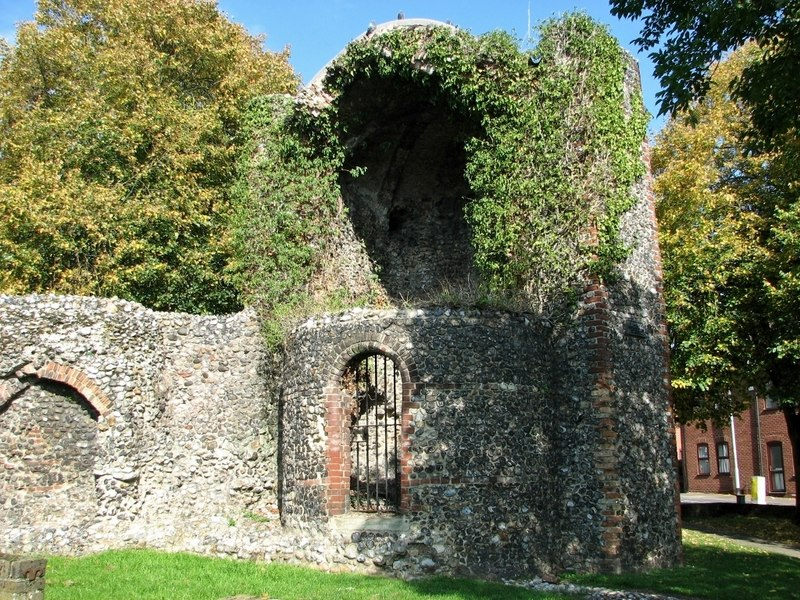
Bull Close Tower and wall

Immediately north of Pockthorpe Gate, Bull Close Tower was built about 130 metres north of the river, in the 1320s as suggested by documentary evidence. A flint tower, it is polygonal on its north and east sides and features brick quoins to reinforce its flint work. It had chambers on two floors, with narrow window slits, and a vaulted lower chamber.

The tower is now situated on the junction of Bull Close Road and Silver Road, at a height of just under 8 metres.

=== Black Tower ===
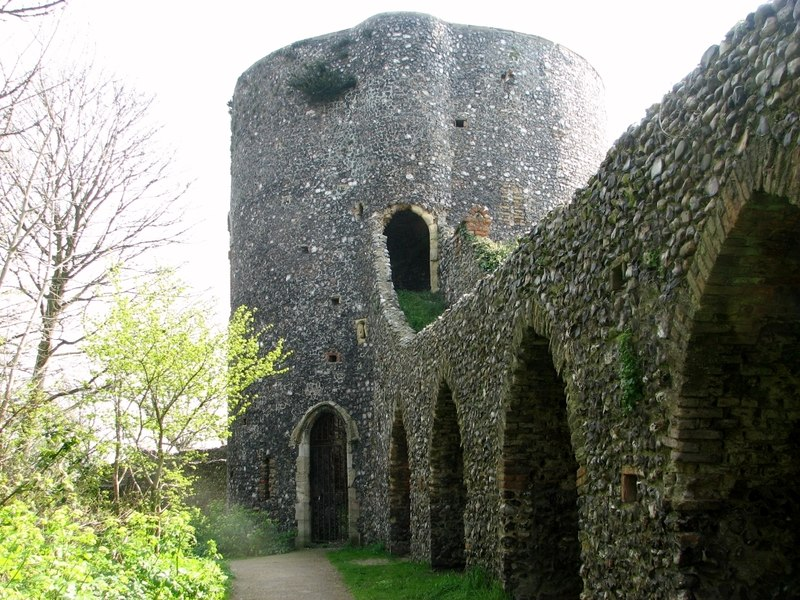
The Black Tower and a section of wall

The Black Tower was 6 metres tall and situated 100 metres west of Conisford Gate, on a ridge over 30 metres higher than King Street. It was likely planned as a lookout point over both river access from the sea, and over the countryside to the south and east. The tower was traditionally the residence of the Constable. In 1665, it was used as an isolation hospital for victims of the plague epidemic. It is one of the best preserved of the towers. In the 1770s, a windmill was built on top of the tower. It was a snuff mill and was later used as a cotton mill and observatory. The Black Tower was struck by ball lightning in July 1833 and was burnt out.

=== Boom Towers ===
The Boom Towers are located in the west of the city, flanking the river near what is now Carrow Bridge. They consist of one circular tower on the western Thorpe bank and one semi-circular tower on the eastern Carrow bank. The pair mark one end of a particularly well-preserved section of the wall. The Conisford Gate was located 50 metres to the north of these towers.

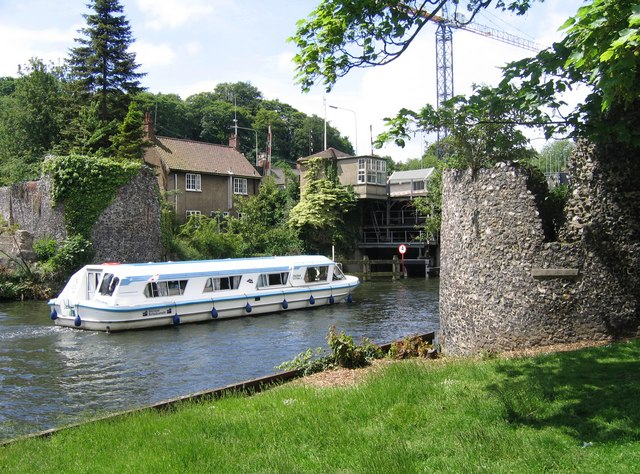
Remains of the Boom Towers

The eastern Boom Tower, also known as the Devil's Tower, is isolated from the wall on the other side of the river, and had no ditch or any other defensive earthwork. It had a door facing the river and two internal floors linked by a brick and flint staircase, and featured three bartizan turrets above its crenellated parapet. The tower was constructed for Spynk, likely between 1333 and 1343, and probably designed solely to carry the iron staple for a chain which spanned the river. It was notably ignored during Kett's Rebellion in 1549 as taking it lacked any practical combat purpose. There is no documentary evidence of this tower ever being occupied, although the tower had two wardens; Richard Drewe and John Bray.

The western Boom Tower or windlass tower could raise and lower the chain. It was known to have been occupied by the tower keeper. It contains an 18th-century coke oven.

=== Cow Tower ===
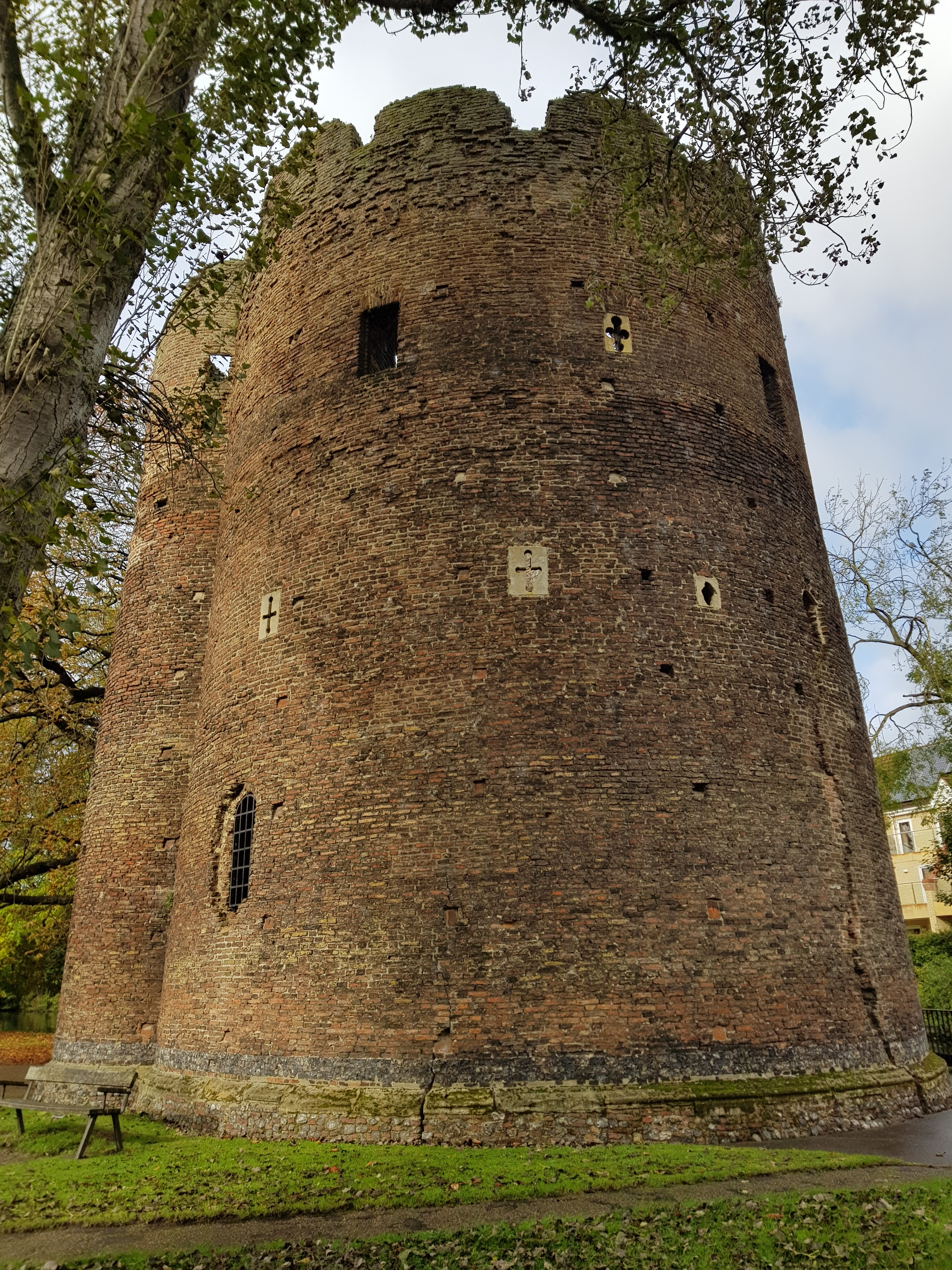
Cow Tower

The Cow Tower is 15 metres high and two metres thick, and is situated in the angle of the River Wensum, north-east of St Giles' Hospital. It was constructed late in the 14th century, according to surviving building accounts from 1397 and 1398, which also record the use of 170 carts of stone as well as carts of sand, lime and bricks, to build it. Materials for it were brought from Norwich as well as from places such as Great Yarmouth, from which was purchased 200 sparres (fir poles). It was provided with or for small guns. Its placement on the bend of the river suggests its potential use as a blockhouse against waterborne attacks.

== Gates ==
There were 12 city gates constructed in the Norwich city walls.

Three of the gates, St Augustine's, Conisford and Bishop's, were blocked up with earth during the English Civil War. Colonel Charles Fleetwood’s regiment of the New Model Army from East Dereham entered the city through several of the gates unsecured by rioters on 24 April 1648, prior to the Great Blow. The previous day, Christopher Bransby had lead a company around the city gates to demand the watchmen keep them locked; he obtained several keys, though not enough to halt Fleetwood.

All of the gates were pulled down between 1791 and 1810, to improve the flow of traffic, with most being demolished in 1793 and 1794; the gate at Magdalen Street was the last to be pulled down, in 1808. This list sorts the gates starting from the north-east corner of the Norwich city walls at the River Wensum, and continues counter-clockwise.

=== Pockthorpe Gate ===
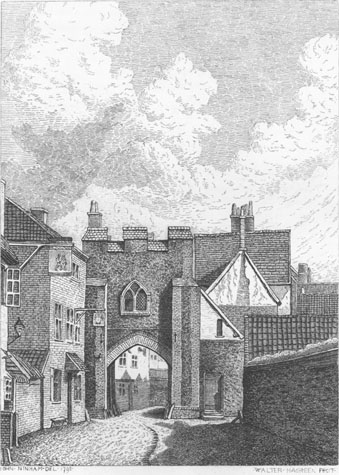
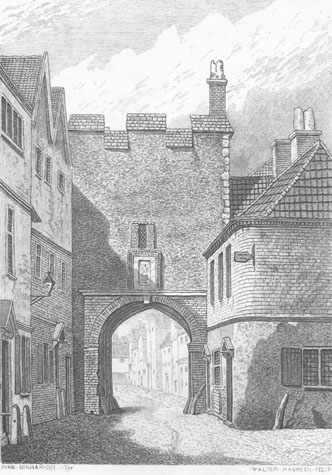
Inside and outside Pockthorpe Gate by John Ninham

Pocktorpe or Barre Gate (TG 2353 0940) was located at the north-east corner of Norwich, in the parish of St James, close to the river and below Mousehold Heath. It sat on the road that entered Norwich through the extramural settlement of Pockthorpe. Its flint gateway was likely not built until 1338, according to documentary references, later than many of the other gates. This was possibly due to a land ownership dispute, and a dispute over responsibility for building the north-east walls of the city. Pockthorpe Gate was damaged during Kett's Rebellion in 1549, and it was subsequently rebuilt. It was demolished in 1792.

=== Magdalen Gate ===
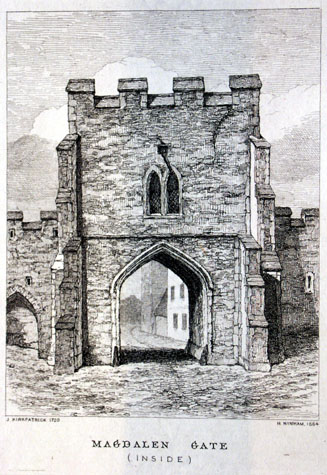
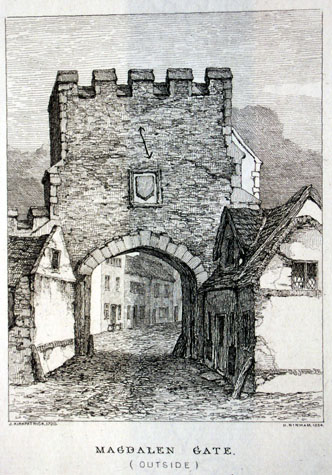
Inside and outside Magdalen Gate by John Kirkpatrick, c. 1720

Magdalen Gate (TG 2316 0964) was the main entrance to Norwich from the north and was one of the three main gates. It was known in the Middle Ages as the Magdalen Gate, as Fibrigge Gate or Leper Gate due to the 12th century leper hospital dedicated to St. Mary Magdalen, that is still to be found at the corner of Sprowston Road and Gilman Road. It was last gate in the city to be fortified, in 1339, built during the last phase of the walls' construction under Spynk. It was repaired in 1756, whitewashed in 1783 and demolished in 1808.

=== St Augustine's Gate ===
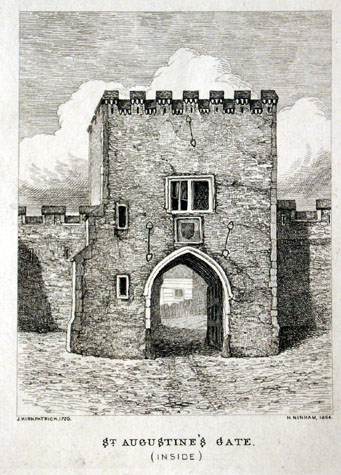
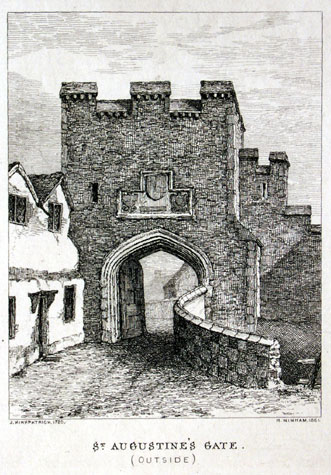
Inside and outside St Augustine's Gate by John Kirkpatrick, c. 1720

St Augustine's Gate (TG 22792 09615) was located on the north side of the city in the ward of Colegate. It was rebuilt shortly prior to 1343 by Spynk. In 1377 there were 12 battlements on the gate. Coslany Ward was responsible for repairs of St. Augustine's Gates in 1451 and 1481. It was blocked up with earth during the English Civil War, alongside the Conisford and Bishop's gates. In 1794, the gate was demolished.

=== St Martin's Gate ===
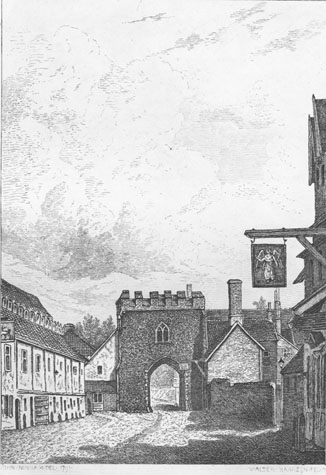
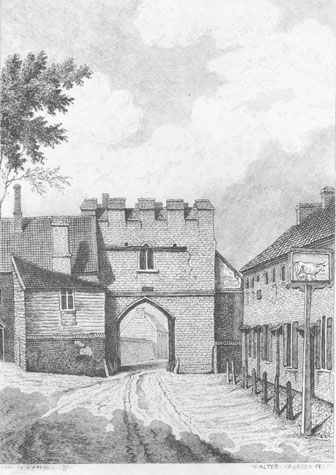
Inside and outside St Martin's Gate by John Ninham, 1791

St Martin's Gate (TG 2260 0952) was located at the north-west corner or the city walls on a ridge above the river. It was first mentioned in 1275, referred to as Porte de Coslayn. It was rebuilt under Spynk in about 1340, and in 1351 was noted to have 10 battlements. It was later referred to as Coslany Gates in about 1461. Coslany Ward was responsible for repairs of St. Martin's Gates in 1451 and 1481. In 1808, the gateway was demolished. Part of the side wall of the gate remained standing as part of a cottage in 1861.

=== Heigham Gate ===
Another north-west corner gate, Heigham Gate (TG 22515 09078) was built on the low ground close to the west bank of the Wensum, about 3 metres above sea level. In the Middle Ages it was known as Middle Ages as Portae Inferni (Hell Gate) possibly due to its position as well as Blake or Black Gate. Heigham Street, also known as Nether Westwyck, was the small street that led to the gate.

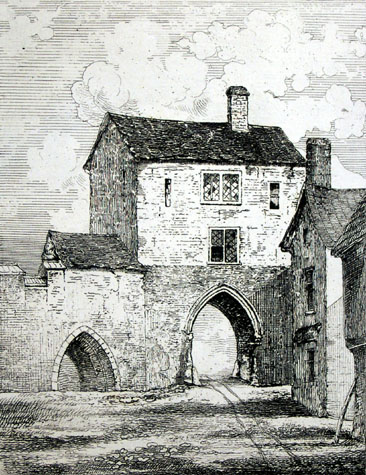
Heigham Gate by James Reeve, 18th century

On St Matthew's Day in 1221, a yearly rental for a common way from the gate to the river, running down to the west Boom Tower, was agreed. It was remodelled in the 14th century under Spynk. Orders to pull down and remodel the gate were given in 1742, though it is unclear whether these orders were executed. Blyth stated in 1842 that the gate "fell down in the beginning of the last century", though it is possible he meant the end of the 18th century.

=== St Benedict's Gate ===
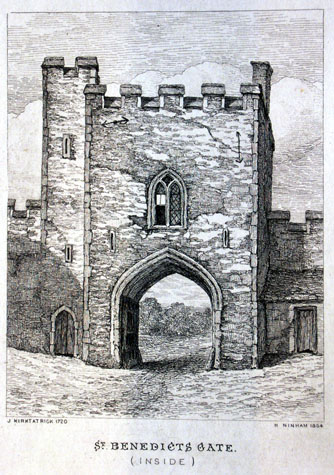
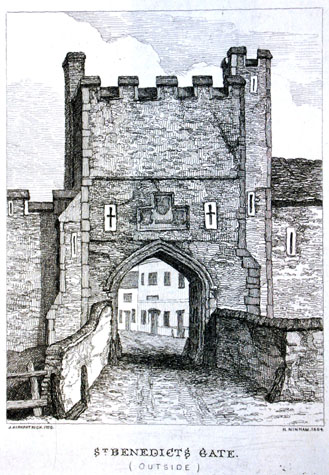
Inside and outside St Benedict's Gate by John Kirkpatrick, c. 1720

St Benedict's Gate (TG 22431 08857), on the west side of the city, was variously known as Porta de Westwyk in 1118/19, St. Bennet's in 1160 as a truncation, and also as Westwyk Gate. It led to King's Lynn and was situated on low ground. It was rebuilt in the 14th century under Spynk. There were 16 battlements on the gate and wicket after this, and it featured a square crenellated stair turret on the west side that provided access to the roof, which was unique among the Norwich gates.

In 1460 four soldiers were on guard at the gate. Norwich residents William Hardingham and Robert Holmes were charged with abusing the city watch at St Benedict's Gate in December 1642, after Hardingham called the watch "jackanapes" and insisted that himself, Holmes and their companions were the true king's watch. The gate was largely taken down in 1793, though its south side survived until World War II as it was incorporated into the side of a house that had been built against it in the 18th century. It was severely damaged in the 1940s by bombing.

=== St Giles Gate ===
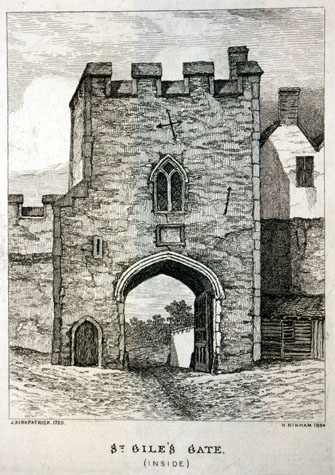
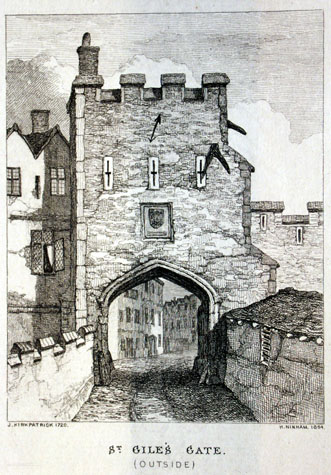
Inside and outside St Giles Gate by John Kirkpatrick, c. 1720

St Giles Gate (TG 22433 08575), also known as Port S. Egidii and as Newport Gate, is first recorded in documents from 1288. It was rebuilt in the 14th century under Spynk. The gateway was relatively tall, with four merlons facing outside the wall and four inwards. On the outer side of the gate was a bridge over the ditch. Above the archway was the coat of arms of the city, and a carved inscription reading:

ADORNATA TEMPORE
MAIORALTIS HENRICI
CROWE ARMIGERI
1679

In 1377 it was noted that there were 15 battlements on the gate. Richard, a hermit, was "abiding at the gates of St Giles" in 1428, according to the will of William Setman; this may refer to St Giles Gate, or the gate of the church of St Giles on the Hill. In 1643 during the English Civil War, the gate was rampired with earth, and this was later removed. Repairs to the gate were requested in 1756 and again in 1763, "by proper workmen". The gate was demolished in 1792. The present day site is at the end of Upper St Giles Street, at the bottom of the ramp for the high level footbridge over the inner ring road.

=== St Stephen's Gate ===
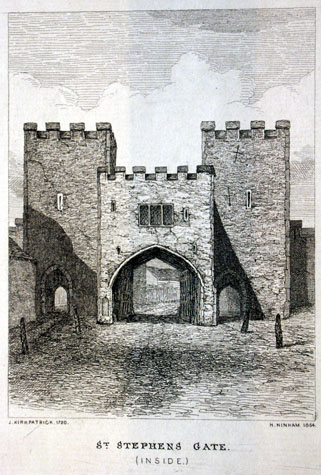
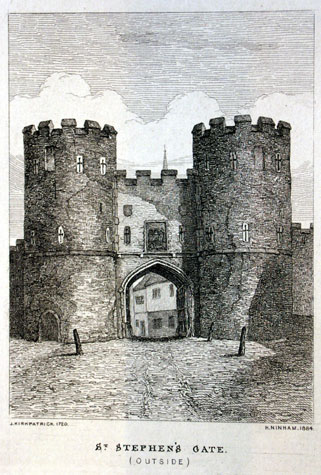
Inside and outside St Stephen's Gate by John Kirkpatrick, c. 1720

St Stephen's Gate (TG 22819 08030) was initially known as Nedham Gate, variously Needham or Nedeham. It is located on the west side of the city, being the main entrance into Norwich from London; St Stephen's Street ran straight from the gate to Norwich Castle. The central gate block featured a chamber above, and was flanked by large D-shaped towers to either side, which were taller than the central section. On the west side was a wicket for pedestrians. There were a total of 38 battlements on the gate and wicket, and by 1549 they featured a working portcullis.

A gate in this location is first recorded in documents in 1285. It was rebuilt in the 14th century under Richard Spynk. The Agistment for the Walls in 1451 and 1481 recorded that St. Stephen's ward was responsible for the gate's repair.

During the 1549 Kett's Rebellion, rebels in Norwich "stopped up" the gates, whereas the Earl of Warwick and his soldiers "beat down the gate to enter by"; the master gunner broke down the gate's portcullis and "several breaches" were made in the walls between the St Stephen's and St Giles's gates. A messenger who had come to take Mayor John Utting to London in 1648, sparking a riot which led to the Great Blow of Norwich, left through this gate without the Mayor due to the unrest. In 1793, St Stephen's Gate was demolished, resulting from the widening of the street caused by the opening of Thetford Turnpike in 1767.

=== Brazen Doors ===
Brazen Doors or Brazen Gates (TG 2302 0790) was originally a postern also known variously as the Iron Door(s) and Gates of Swinemarket, possibly created due to the movement of the swine market from All Saints Green to a new site outside the walls in the late 14th century. A document inferred to be from around 1345 omits these gates, thereby impying that they were not yet there; it is possible that the Brazen Doors were adapted from an intermediate tower. In 1384, £19 3s 4d was spent "erecting the walls near Iron Doors". This may have involved alterations to create the gate.

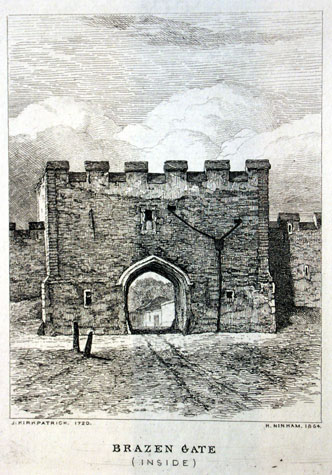
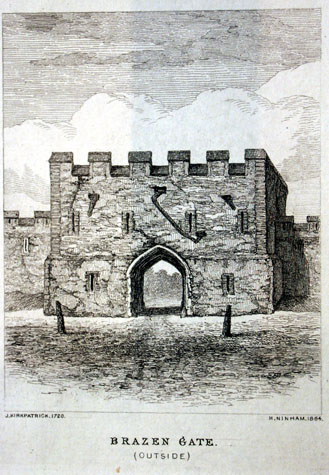
Inside and outside Brazen Doors by John Kirkpatrick, c. 1720

St. Stephen's ward was noted to be responsible for repairs "to the Iron Door" in 1451 and 1481. In a document of 1513 or 1514, one Geofry Lounde paid 16d to lease a tower with a door of brass "called the Tower with the Brazen Dore"; this is a potential explanation for its change of name. 1543 earth was piled across the ditch to form a "Caunsey", likely a causeway to replace its bridge. Kett's Rebellion in 1549 saw the door closed "with great beams, and pieces of timber, and rampired up with earth and stones." Brazen Doors was the first gate taken by the earl of Warwick's forces when they came to break the rebellion. The earth used was then placed in the ditch to enlarge the causeway. The gate arch was rebuilt with red brick and widened in 1726 for coaches and carts to pass through; it became known as New Gate. In 1792 the gate was removed. The gate's site is now a traffic interchange.

=== Ber Street Gate ===
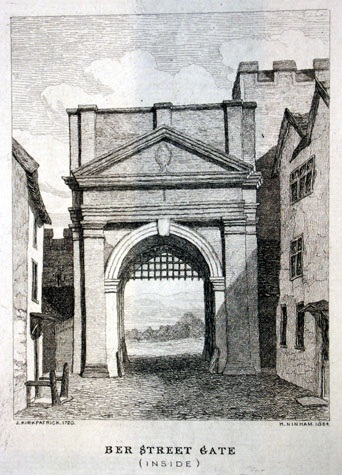
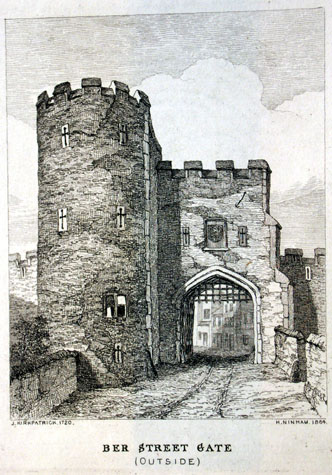
Inside and outside Ber Street Gate by John Kirkpatrick, c. 1720

The central archway of Ber Street Gate (TG 2356 0771), was extant by 1146, and was also known as Porte de Berstrete under Edward I. It was flanked by large semicircular towers with the rounded sides facing the ditch away from the city. In April 1305, William de Asshefeld conveyed his house at the "Gates of Berstete" to the city, including land surrounding it. This was likely part of plans by the city to enlarge the gate. It was rebuilt in about 1340 under supervision of Richard Spynk.

In 1727, the central block and its archway on the City side of the gate were remodelled in red brick, including a pediment supported on Doric pilasters. The arch collapsed in 1807, and the north tower was demolished not long after.

=== Conisford Gate ===
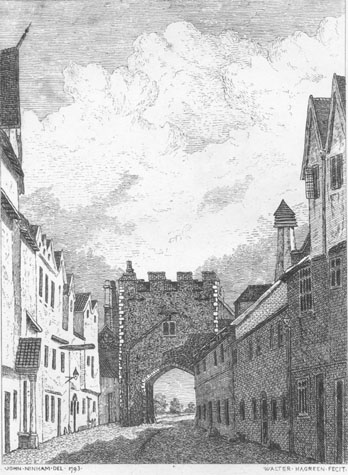
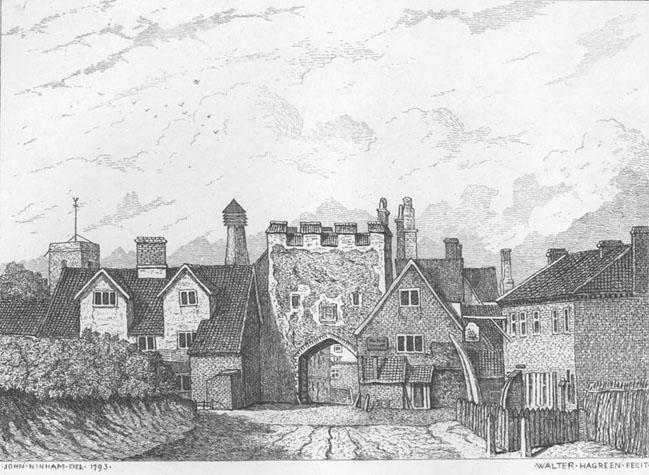
Inside and outside Conisford Gate by John Ninham, 1793

Also known as the King Street Gate (TG 2388 0766), the Conisford or Conesford Gate was likely extant by 1175, before the construction of the rest of the walls. It receives its earliest mentions in records in the 12th century, prior to the construction of the wall itself. It is located on the south end of King Street, a possible former Roman road and one of the most important roads in the medieval city. It was set over 6 metres above the water on the west bank of the river. Carrow Abbey is located immediately beyond the gate. The Boom Towers are located 50 metres north, and the Black Tower is 100 metres west. It is located at what was likely at the most vulnerable point in the city's defences, and as such it was of significant importance.

In 1377, Conisford Gate was recorded to have 14 battlements. It was blocked up with earth during the English Civil War, alongside St Augustine's and Bishop's gates. The gate was demolished in 1794.

=== Bishop Bridge Gate ===
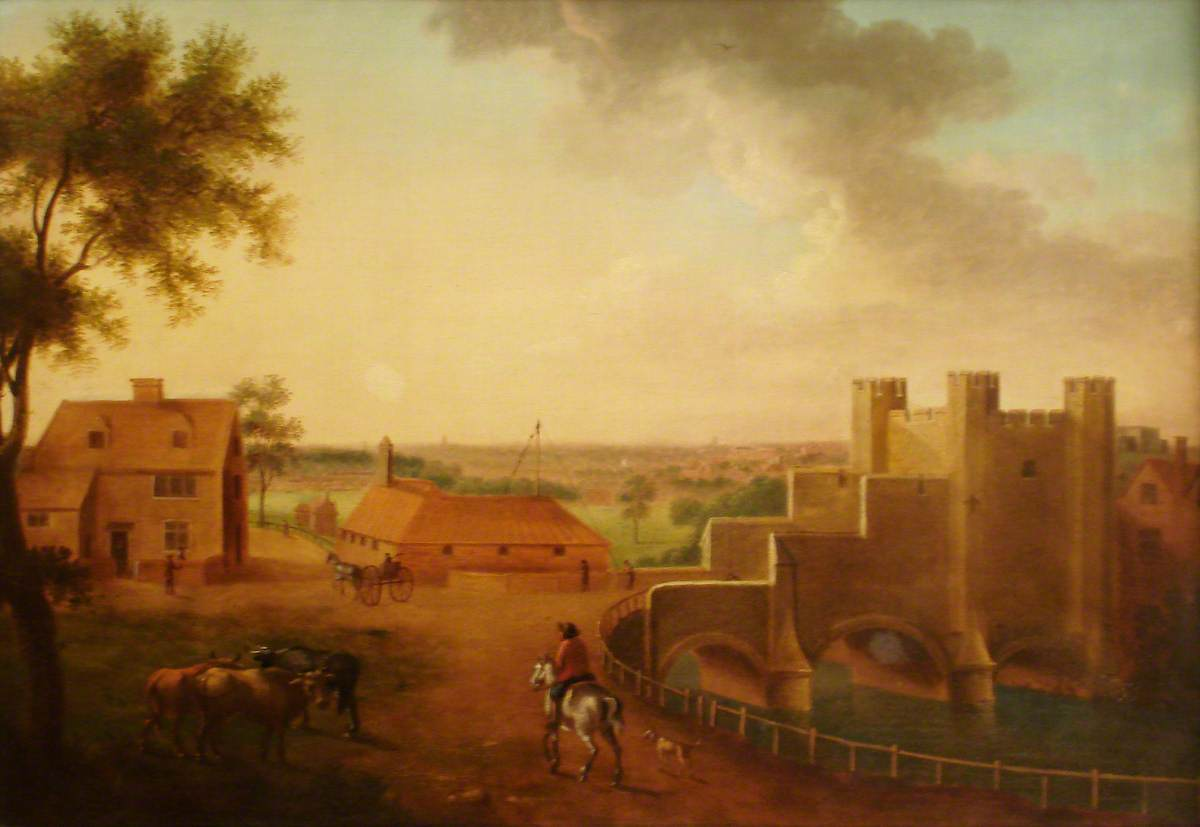
An oil painting of Bishop Bridge Gate (c. 1780)

Bishop Bridge (TG 23987 08991) is east of the Norwich Cathedral at the end of Bishopgate. The cathedral's prior was granted a licence to build the bridge in 1275, though the surviving stone bridge is said to date from around 1340, financed by Spynk who also financed the building of the arches and gate above the first arch of the bridge on the city side, consisting of a single square tower with octagonal turrets and battlements. Bishop's Bridge Gate was blocked up with earth during the English Civil War, alongside the St Augustine's and Conisford gates. The gateway was demolished in October or November 1791.

Bishop's Bridge Gate is not to be confused with the nearby Bishop's Gate, (TG2349809057) which survives and is a Grade I listed building, completed by 1436. It controlled access to Bishop's Palace, and was not part of the city defences.

== See also ==
- List of town walls in England and Wales
