= Leper hospitals in medieval England =

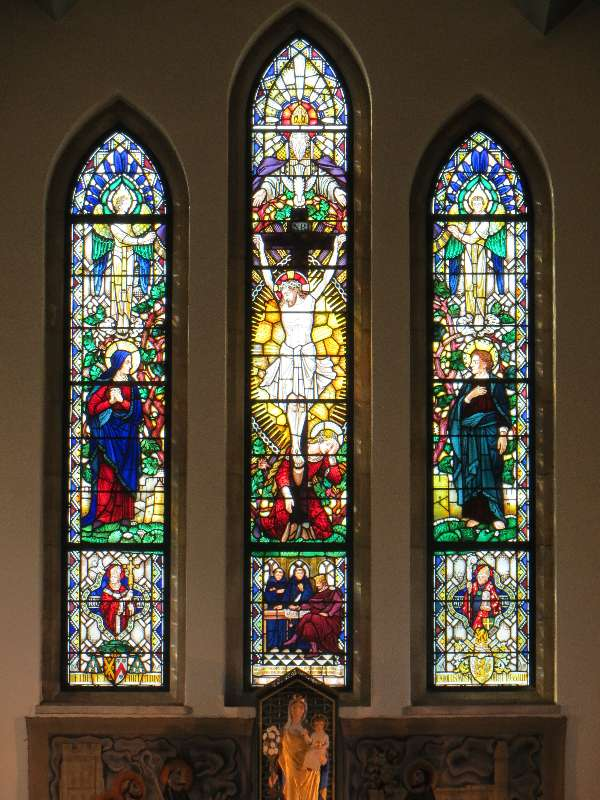
Stained glass window in The Shrine of Our Lady St Mary of Glastonbury.

Leper hospitals, or leprosaria, were specialised institutions in medieval England that provided care for individuals suffering from Leprosy. These hospitals were predominantly established between the 11th and 13th centuries, often by religious organisations, monarchs, and wealthy benefactors as acts of charity. By the 13th century, England was home to approximately 300 of these facilities, with notable examples including St. Mary Magdalen Hospital in Winchester and St. Leonard's Hospital in York.

These institutions served a dual purpose: they were both medical facilities and religious communities. Residents adhered to strict routines of prayer and isolation, reflecting the societal fear of leprosy as a contagious and divinely ordained affliction.

== First recorded cases and medical perceptions ==
In medieval England, leprosy was a chronic and debilitating disease, often referred to as lepra or morbus elephas. It was caused by the bacterium Mycobacterium leprae, which primarily targeted the skin, peripheral nerves, and mucous membranes, leading to progressive disfigurement and disability.

The first recorded cases of leprosy in England date back to the Anglo-Saxon era, but it wasn't until the 11th to 14th centuries that the disease became more widespread. Archaeological findings have confirmed the presence of leprosy sufferers during this period in medieval England.

Diagnosis was primarily based on visible symptoms such as skin lesions, numbness, and deformities. However, the lack of precise diagnostic tools led to frequent misclassification, with various skin ailments being labeled as leprosy.

=== Leprosy spread in medieval England ===
The spread of leprosy in medieval England is linked to increased trade and movement of populations. The Norman Conquest of 1066 and subsequent Crusades facilitated greater interaction between England and leprosy-endemic regions such as the Middle East and Mediterranean. Pilgrims, soldiers, and merchants traveling these routes likely contributed to the transmission of Mycobacterium leprae.

== Origins and growth of leper hospitals ==
=== Early foundations (11th - 12th century) ===
The establishment of leper hospitals in England began following the Norman Conquest of 1066. The Normans introduced significant ecclesiastical reforms, leading to greater church involvement in public health and charitable institutions.

This period saw the foundation of England's first dedicated leper hospitals, established under the patronage of religious houses or noble benefactors. The influence of the Church played a crucial role in shaping these institutions, with bishops and abbots advocating for their creation as both a form of charity and a means of spiritual atonement.

Monastic orders, particularly the Benedictines and Augustinians, were central to the administration of these hospitals. Many were attached to existing monasteries or run by monks who provided spiritual guidance, basic medical care, and oversight of daily life. One of the earliest recorded leper hospitals in England was the Hospital of St. Mary Magdalen Hospital in Winchester, founded in the late 11th or early 12th century. Archaeological excavations at the site have revealed structural remains consistent with contemporary hospital designs, including a central chapel, dormitories, and infirmary spaces.

=== Expansion and peak (13th century) ===
The 13th century marked the height of leper hospital expansion in England, driven by increasing concerns over the spread of leprosy and the Church's continued emphasis on acts of charity.

The widespread belief that caring for lepers brought spiritual merit led to a surge in hospital foundations. By this time, an estimated 300 to 400 leper hospitals had been founded across England. Most leper hospitals were constructed outside city walls or along major roads to balance the need for isolation with accessibility. The medieval understanding of leprosy as a contagious and morally significant disease necessitated the separation of lepers from the general population.

=== Decline of leper hospitals (14th - 16th century) ===
The decline of leper hospitals in medieval England was the result of a complex interplay between changes in the spread of leprosy and shifts in societal attitudes. By the 14th century, leprosy was already on the wane across Western Europe, and in England, many hospitals were left with dwindling patient numbers or were repurposed to serve other medical and charitable needs. The devastating impact of the Black Death between 1347 and 1351 further hastened this decline, as public concern turned to other infectious diseases. Later, the Dissolution of the Monasteries under Henry VIII between 1536 and 1541 sealed the fate of many remaining religious hospitals, leading to their closure.

==== Impact of the Black Death (1347–1351) ====
The Black Death, which swept across Europe between 1347 and 1351, had a profound impact on England's healthcare system, diverting resources and public attention away from leprosy toward the more immediate and devastating effects of the plague. The sheer scale of mortality, estimated to have killed between 30% and 50% of England's population, led to a collapse in many institutions, including leper hospitals. An estimated 20% of mortality occurred among clergy members, who often tended to the sick and contracted the diseases themselves.

The pandemic had a crippling effect on the finances of leper hospitals. Many of the nobles and clergy who had traditionally supported these institutions fell victim to the plague, resulting in a drastic drop in charitable donations. This financial strain made it impossible for numerous leper hospitals to continue operating. The situation was further complicated by the loss of clergy and hospital staff. The high mortality rate among monks, priests, and caregivers left many leper hospitals without enough personnel to keep them running, often leading to their closure or repurposing.

==== Impact of tuberculosis ====
Another hypothesis links the decrease in leprosy to the rise of Tuberculosis (TB), caused by Mycobacterium tuberculosis, a closely related pathogen. Some studies suggest that exposure to TB may have provided cross-immunity against leprosy, leading to a reduced incidence of the disease in European populations.

== Evolution of leper hospitals post-14th century ==
=== Re-purposing of institutions ===
As the need for leper hospitals declined, many of these institutions were gradually converted into almshouses, hospitals for the poor, or other charitable establishments. In some cases, existing leper hospitals retained their original names and endowments but began admitting non-leprous residents, particularly elderly or impoverished individuals. Some former leper hospitals were absorbed into larger monastic hospitals, where they served a broader range of patients suffering from various chronic ailments.

=== The dissolution of the monasteries (1536–1541) ===
The final blow to leper hospitals in England came during the Dissolution of the Monasteries (1536–1541) under King Henry VIII. This sweeping policy, aimed at seizing Church property and wealth, resulted in the closure of hundreds of monastic institutions, including many leper hospitals that had been under the control of religious orders.

== Structure and organisation of leper hospitals ==
=== Physical layout ===
Leper hospitals in medieval England followed a relatively uniform architectural design, reflecting their dual function as religious institutions and places of medical care. Most hospitals were arranged around a central chapel, which served as the spiritual heart of the community. Religious observance played a crucial role in the lives of residents, and chapels were often designed to allow lepers to participate in services while remaining physically separated from non-leprous congregants.

Given the high mortality rate associated with leprosy, hospitals had burial grounds, situated within the hospital complex or in adjacent churchyards. Archaeological excavations at St. Mary Magdalen Hospital, Winchester, one of the best-preserved medieval leper hospitals, have uncovered human remains showing skeletal signs of advanced lepromatous disease, providing insights into the health and demographics of hospital residents.

=== Daily life of residents ===
Admission to a leper hospital was generally limited to those who had been officially diagnosed with leprosy. However, records show that not all residents were necessarily suffering from the disease. Some institutions accepted individuals afflicted with other chronic illnesses or disfigurements, particularly as the incidence of leprosy declined in later centuries. The requirements for entry varied; in some cases, applicants were asked to take religious vows, committing themselves to a life of piety and isolation.

Life in leper hospitals often resembled that of monastic communities. Residents participated in religious services several times a day, with prayers, scripture readings, and masses forming a crucial part of their daily routine. Some hospitals adhered to strict Benedictine or Augustinian rules, which included maintaining silence during meals and engaging in communal labor whenever possible.

Medical care in leper hospitals was rudimentary but structured. Residents received basic medical attention, including wound care and herbal remedies administered by hospital clerics or lay attendants. Dietary regulations were often prescribed, with hospitals providing nutrient-rich foods such as fish, bread, and pottage to support the weakened immune systems of lepers.

=== Governance ===
The administration of leper hospitals was typically under the oversight of monastic orders or ecclesiastical authorities, who would appoint a hospital master to manage the day-to-day operations. This master, often a monk or priest, was responsible for handling the hospital's finances, maintaining order among the residents, and ensuring that both religious obligations and the care of the sick were upheld.

== Leper hospitals and society in Medieval England ==
=== Public attitudes toward lepers ===
Leprosy in medieval England was not merely a medical condition but a deeply stigmatised affliction that shaped societal perceptions and policies toward its sufferers. The theological interpretations of the disease, coupled with fears of contagion, led to widespread social exclusion, legal restrictions, and the institutionalisation of charitable almsgiving practices. The role of leper hospitals in this context was both paradoxical and instrumental: while they provided shelter and religious solace for lepers, they also reinforced societal segregation by physically isolating the afflicted from the general population.

=== Theological Interpretations ===
In medieval Christian doctrine, leprosy was frequently regarded as a manifestation of divine punishment, often linked to moral or spiritual failings. This belief was influenced by biblical narratives, particularly those in the Old Testament, which depicted leprosy as a sign of divine wrath (e.g., the affliction of King Uzziah in 2 Chronicles 26:19–21). Medieval theologians such as St. Augustine and Pope Gregory the Great reinforced the notion that leprosy was both a curse and a test, arguing that sufferers were either bearing the weight of their own sins or serving as a reminder of humanity's fallen state.

However, theological interpretations were not entirely negative. Some Christian scholars, particularly within monastic and mendicant orders, framed leprosy as a form of spiritual purification, likening lepers to Christ due to their suffering and social rejection. This perspective led to an ambivalent approach toward lepers—while they were feared and marginalised, they were also seen as deserving of Christian charity. This belief encouraged the establishment of leper hospitals, where caring for the afflicted was considered an act of piety that could earn spiritual merit.

=== Almsgiving practices ===
The marginalisation of lepers led to the institutionalisation of almsgiving as a key aspect of medieval charity. Many leper hospitals were strategically placed along pilgrimage routes or city outskirts, where residents could solicit alms from passing travellers. In some hospitals, almsgiving was formally regulated, with designated collection points or hospital representatives assigned to receive donations.

Charitable giving to lepers was seen as an act of Christian virtue, reinforcing the religious significance of leprosy. Wealthy patrons, including monarchs, clergy, and merchants, frequently endowed hospitals with land and resources as a means of securing divine favor or demonstrating piety.

== Legal and religious regulations ==
=== Church directives ===
The Catholic Church was instrumental in establishing formal policies regarding the segregation and care of lepers. Various Church councils, including the Third Lateran Council (1179) and the Fourth Lateran Council (1215), issued decrees emphasizing the need for separate living spaces for lepers to prevent moral and physical contamination.

Many leper hospitals were under direct ecclesiastical control, with bishops or monastic orders overseeing their administration. Some hospitals followed monastic Rule-based governance, particularly those affiliated with the Augustinians or Benedictine orders, requiring residents to adhere to strict religious discipline.

=== Royal policies ===
While leper hospitals were predominantly church-led initiatives, the Crown also played a role in their governance by granting royal charters that conferred legal recognition and special privileges. Some hospitals received direct patronage from English monarchs, who provided funding or land endowments in exchange for prayers and religious services offered on their behalf.

=== Institutional rules ===
Each leper hospital had its own set of internal rules governing the daily conduct of residents and hospital staff. These regulations varied by institution but often included:

- Strict enforcement of religious obligations, requiring lepers to attend mass daily and observe fasting periods.
- Restrictions on movement, with some hospitals prohibiting residents from leaving without permission.
- Behavioral rules, sometimes including vows of chastity or obedience similar to those in monastic life.

Hospitals also had guidelines on financial management and land use, particularly those that owned agricultural estates. Some institutions leased out farmland to generate income, while others relied on tenant labor or monastery-supported economies.

== Notable excavations ==
=== St. Mary Magdalen Hospital, Winchester ===
One of the most extensively studied leper hospitals in England is St. Mary Magdalen, Winchester. Founded in the late 11th or early 12th century, it was one of the earliest known leper hospitals in England and continued to function into the late medieval period.

Excavations at the site, led by Simon Roffey and colleagues, uncovered structural remains indicating a typical leper hospital layout, including a chapel, dormitories, infirmaries, and a cemetery. The discovery at St. Mary Magdalene was a large burial site containing skeletal remains with clear signs of leprosy. Osteoarchaeological analysis identified bone lesions, facial deformities, and limb damage consistent with advanced stages of Mycobacterium leprae infection.

Further analysis of the remains revealed important insights into the social status and diet of hospital residents. Stable isotope analysis indicated that many individuals buried at St. Mary Magdalene had access to protein-rich diets, suggesting that individuals with leprosy were perhaps not treated as poorly as previously thought.

=== Other notable excavated leper hospital sites ===
Excavations at St. James' Leper Hospital, Chichester, uncovered foundations of medieval buildings and evidence of a segregated burial ground, indicating that lepers were buried separately from non-leprous hospital residents.

Investigations at Chichester, another medieval leper hospital, revealed architectural evidence of dormitories and infirmary spaces, as well as traces of herbal gardens, suggesting that some level of medicinal treatment was provided to residents. Skeletal remains showed varying degrees of leprosy progression, with some individuals displaying only mild bone damage, indicating that lepers may have been admitted at different stages of the disease.
