= St Leonard's Priory, Norwich =

Priory in Norwich, Norfolk, England

St Leonard's Priory, Norwich was a priory in Norfolk, England. It was a dependent cell of Norwich Cathedral before the Reformation. In 1542, it was acquired by the Earl of Surrey and turned into the mansion of Mount Surrey. During Kett's Rebellion, 1549, it was used as to imprison the rebel's 'gentry captives'.
