= Thomas Baskerville =

Thomas Baskerville may refer to:

- Thomas Baskerville (died 1572), MP for Worcestershire
- Thomas Baskerville (general) (died 1597), MP for Carmarthen Boroughs
- Thomas Baskerville (topographer) (1630–1720), English topographer
- Thomas Baskerville (botanist) (1812–1840), English botanical writer
- Thomas Baskerville Mynors Baskerville (1790–1864), British politician

== See also ==
- Baskerville (surname)
