= Monkton Farleigh Manor =

Grade I listed manor house in Monkton Farleigh, United Kingdom

Coordinates: 51.3890°N 2.2798°W

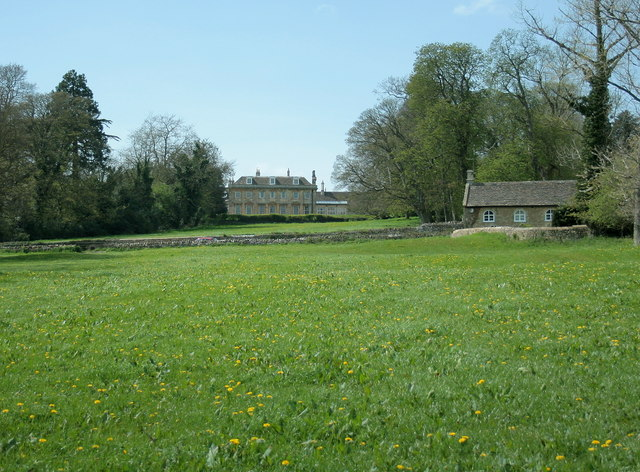
Monkton Farleigh Manor

Monkton Farleigh Manor is a Grade I listed country house close to the village of Monkton Farleigh in Wiltshire, England. Built on the site of a Cluniac priory founded in 1125, the house is about 3 miles (5 km) northwest of Bradford-on-Avon and 4 miles (6 km) east of the city of Bath.

== History ==
In 1536 Sir Edward Seymour, then Viscount Beauchamp, obtained a grant of the site and ground of the former Monkton Farleigh priory, its church, bell-tower, and churchyard, the manor and advowson of Farleigh, and all the property in Farleigh.

The earliest part of the manor house, built of materials from the priory and dating from the 16th century, is on the western side. There were additions in the 17th century, and in the 18th century further extensive additions were made. Above the mullioned windows are 12th and 13th century carved fragments from the adjoining monastic site, including a coffin lid with a carved cross. The cellars of the house belonged to the original conventual buildings of the priory. Part of an altar tomb with heavy carving from the priory has been incorporated into a chimney-piece at Monkton House in nearby Broughton Gifford.

The house was occupied by the Seymour family from 1737 to 1804. In 1812 the lease was acquired from the Bishop of Salisbury by John son of Richard Long of Rood Ashton, on whose death in 1833 it passed to his son John. The Longs retained the lease until 1842, when it passed to Wade Browne. After his death in 1851 it was sublet to a succession of tenants, and eventually the Ecclesiastical Commissioners formed the manor into a freehold estate, and the part of it attached to the manor house, along with the house itself, was sold in 1873 to Sir Charles Hobhouse, Bt, whose descendants are the present owners.

Bishop Jewel's Room in the old west wing is named after John Jewel, who died at the house in 1571.

The house was recorded as Grade I listed in 1962. Near the house, a free-standing gable end wall – the remains of the priory's 13th-century refectory – is also Grade I listed.
