= Bayworth =

Hamlet in Oxfordshire, England

Coordinates: 51.707°N 01.277°W

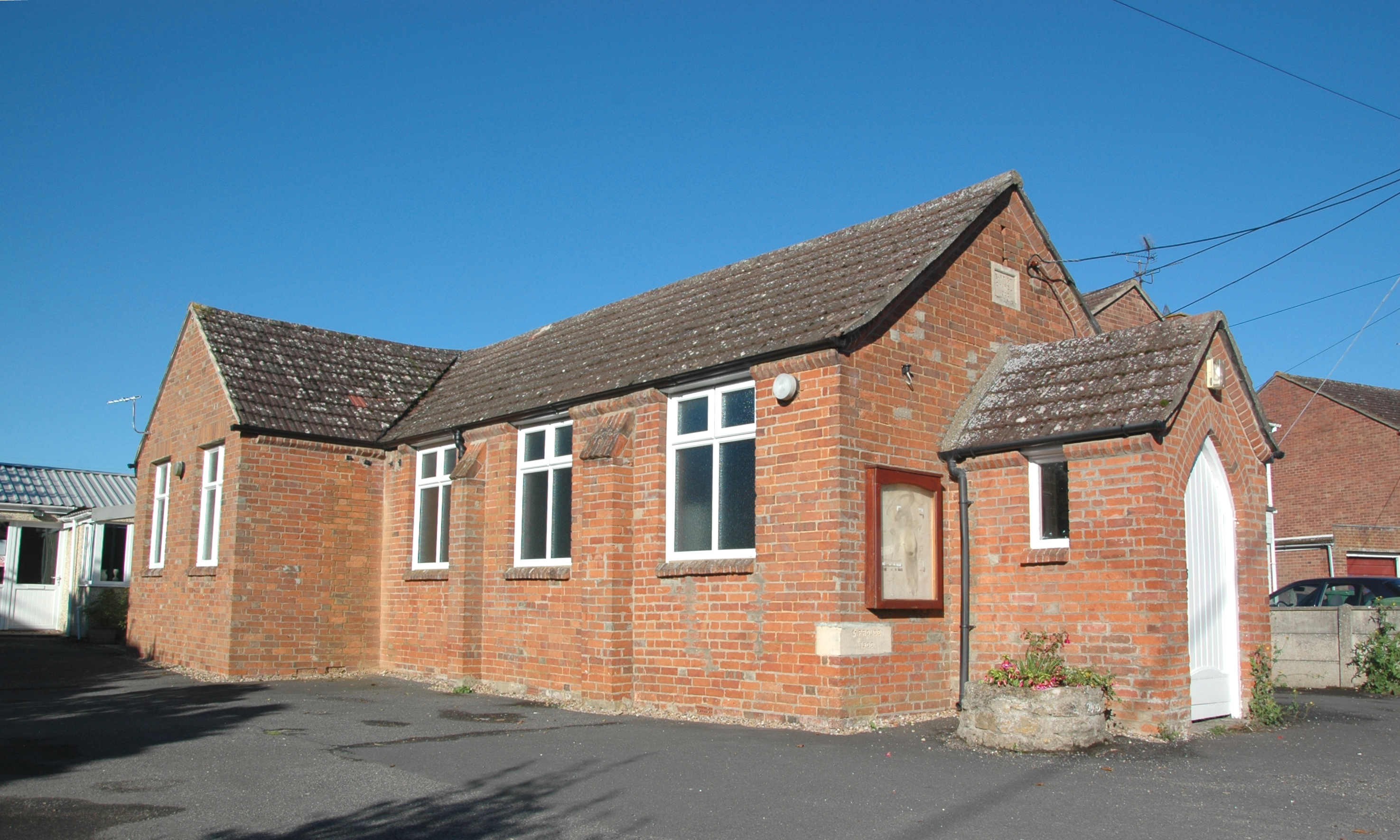
- Bayworth Baptist Church

- Location within Oxfordshire
- OS grid reference: SP500012
- Civil parish: Sunningwell
- District: Vale of White Horse
- Shire county: Oxfordshire
- Region: South East
- Country: England
- Sovereign state: United Kingdom
- Post town: Abingdon
- Postcode district: OX13
- Dialling code: 01865
- Police: Thames Valley
- Fire: Oxfordshire
- Ambulance: South Central
- UK Parliament: Oxford West and Abingdon
- Website: Sunningwell Parish Council

Bayworth is a hamlet in the civil parish of Sunningwell about 3 miles (5 km) south of Oxford, England. Bayworth was part of Berkshire until the 1974 boundary changes transferred it to Oxfordshire.

== Toponym ==
Bayworth's toponym has evolved from Baegenweorthe in the 10th century through Baiorôe in the 11th century, Baiwurde in the 12th century and Beyworth in the 13th century before reaching its current form.

== Manor ==
In 956 the manor of Bayworth was part of a grant of 25 hides of land from King Eadwig to his minister Ælfric, who in turn granted it to Abingdon Abbey. The Domesday Book of 1086 assesses Bayworth at 10 hides. The Abbey divided Bayworth into two manors that it let until the 14th century. In 1324 Hugh Paynel, priest of the parish of Chilton, received the tenancy of one of the manors by enfeoffment but in 1329 he granted it to the Abbot of Abingdon in return for Mass to be said in Bayworth chapel for the souls of himself and his ancestors. In 1390 Thomas and Elizabeth de Childrey conveyed the other manor to feoffees, who two years later granted it to the Abbot of Abingdon in return for Mass to be said in St Mary's Chapel in the Abbey church for the soul of Abbot Peter. From 1392 Bayworth was reunited as one manor under Abingdon Abbey, which installed a keeper to manage it. The Abbey held Bayworth, along with Sunningwell, until 1538 when it surrendered all its properties to the Crown in the Dissolution of the Monasteries.

In 1545 the manors of Sunningwell and Bayworth were granted to Robert Browne (a goldsmith), Christopher Edmondes and William Wenlowe. They seem to have been speculators who bought them for a quick profit, as they alienated them in 1546. The buyer was John Williams, later Baron Williams of Thame. Baron Williams died in 1559 without a male heir, and the manors passed to his elder daughter Margery and her husband Henry Norris, 1st Baron Norreys. In 1583 Margery sold Sunningwell and Bayworth to her younger sister Isabel and her second husband Richard Huddleston. By 1589 Richard and Isabel were dead and had left the two manors mortgaged to a Richard Martin.

In 1597 Martin sold the manors to the Elizabethan general Sir Thomas Baskerville, but he died on a campaign in Picardy that year so he probably never lived there. Baskerville's son, the antiquarian Hannibal Baskerville (1597–1668), did live at Bayworth. He was a philanthropist who built a barn at Bayworth for beggars to stay in. The Baskervilles also had a mansion Bayworth, but it has not survived. Hannibal was succeeded by his son Thomas Baskerville and grandson Matthew Baskerville, but the latter died in 1720–21 with no legitimate heir. During his lifetime Matthew Baskerville had sold Sunningwell and Bayworth in return for an annuity of £80 to Sir John Stonehouse, lord of the manor of Radley. Sunningwell and Bayworth remained with the Stonehouse family and their successors the Bowyers until about 1884, when an Edgar John Disney of Ingatestone in Essex foreclosed a mortgage on the manor. He retained the manor for the rest of his life, but his son Edgar Norton Disney sold most of it in 1912.

== Chapels ==
There was a chapel in the village by 1329, when Hugh Paynel endowed it for Mass to be said there for the souls of himself and his ancestors. It was a dependent chapelry of the parish church of St Leonard, Sunningwell. The antiquarian Anthony Wood (1632–95) visited Hannibal Baskerville and said the chapel was attached to the Baskerville mansion. Wood said the chapel had "painted windows" that soldiers from Abingdon had defaced during the English Civil War. However, he found it furnished with carpets, velvet cushions and "an excellent organ". The tithes of the chapel belonged to St Nicholas' parish church in Abingdon, and in 1712 the rector of St Nicholas' sued the rector of Sunningwell for withholding them. Thereafter no records of the chapel are known, so it may have fallen into decay after Matthew Baskerville died in 1720–21. In 1900 a Baptist chapel was built at Bayworth in connection with New Road Baptist Church, Oxford.

== Residential development ==
Most of the houses in Bayworth are post-war semi-detached and terraced properties, grouped around a small village green, at the junction of Quarry Road and Green Lane. Bayworth Park, to the north of the settlement, is a residential mobile home park.

== Sources ==
- Page, W.H.; Ditchfield, P.H., eds. (1924). A History of the County of Berkshire, Volume 4. Victoria County History. pp. 423–427.
