= My Lord's Garden =

Former pleasure garden in Norwich, England

- Interactive map of My Lord's Garden
- Type: Pleasure garden
- Location: Norwich
- OS grid: TG 2354 0827
- Coordinates: 52.6262°N 1.3015°E
- Created: 1663
- Designer: John Evelyn
- Status: No longer extant

My Lord's Garden was a pleasure garden laid out by John Evelyn for Henry Howard, 6th Duke of Norfolk in circa 1663. Consisting of two acres of gardens and orchards in the ruins of the friary of the city's Austin Friars, it was located between the River Wensum and the street Conesford Inferior (later St Faith's Lane, Mountebank Lane) in the parish of St Peter Parmentergate in the Conesford ward. It is Evelyn's only known city garden that was public space (though it was not open to the general public), and the earliest known commercial garden in the city. It is now the site of St Anne's Quarter, though its 'summerhouse', Howard's House, is still extant.

== Description ==
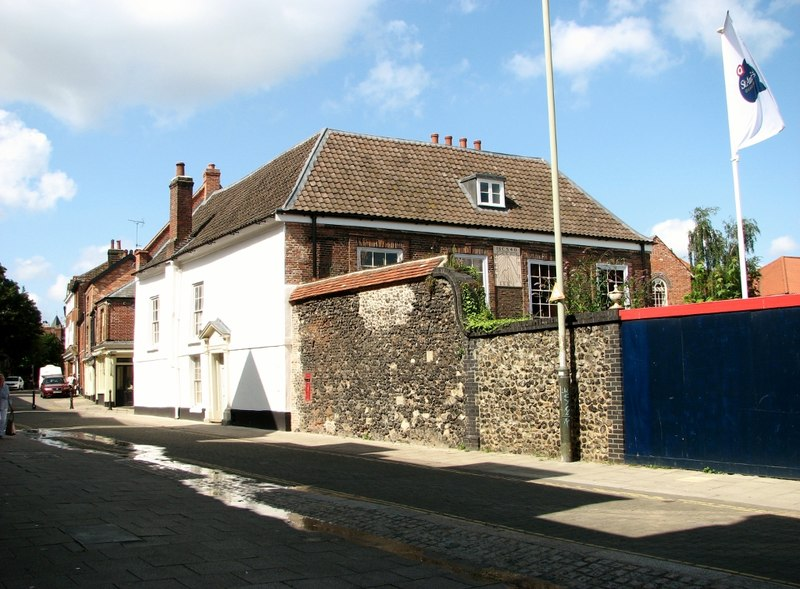
Howard's House, the 'summerhouse' built alongside My Lord's Garden, now at 97 King Street.

Positioned on the southeastern bend of the river, the garden likely retained the walls of the Austin Friars. It included two acres of orchards and gardens. A 'summerhouse' was built in the northwest corner of the precinct, known as Howard's House, possibly containing the remains of the friary gatehouse. It was built of red brick and flint rubble, with a pantile roof and rendered street facades. The garden had a bowling green from 1670.

== Background ==
Evelyn's father Richard had acted as a trustee for Thomas Howard, 14th Earl of Arundel in purchasing Albury Park, and Evelyn had become a young protégé of the earl and met with him in Padua, Italy in 1646, the same year he died. The earl's grandson Henry Howard came to Evelyn in 1655 for advice on remodelling Albury Park, and Evelyn's ideas for Albury were likely implemented in 1662. Evelyn thus had links to the Dukes of Norfolk during the Interregnum, and come the Stuart Restoration and the return of the dukes he was in position to work with them as Howard attempted to re-establish his presence in Norfolk. Henry Howard had been living in the Duke's Palace in Norwich despite not yet being Duke of Norfolk, as his brother the 5th Duke of Norfolk was considered 'non compos mentis' and was restrained in Padua. The palace was structurally neglected and notably lacked space for outdoor entertainment, harbouring an almost 200-foot (61 m) bowling alley from the house to the river.

Samuel Tuke was John Evelyn's close friend and relative through his marriage to Mary Evelyn, as Tuke was her cousin. Tuke had been rejected for the position of the Duke of York's secretary as he was a Catholic convert, though became a central figure among Henry Howard and his family, having overseen the education of two of Howard's children. He was confined to Norwich at the time, residing in the Duke's Palace.

The site of My Lord's Garden had previously been occupied by the friary of the Austin Friars, until the dissolution of the monasteries in 1538. Land just to the north of this site, the site of the Grey Friars had already been acquired by the Dukes of Norfolk in 1539 which would later become the Spring Gardens and later still Vauxhall Gardens. After the death of the previous landowner, Mayor of Norwich Roger Mingay, in 1660, Henry Howard bought the Austin Friars site, and the buildings there were torn down in preparation for the garden. Norwich had a reputation at the time as a centre for expert florists who were mostly Protestant émigrés from Northern Europe.

== History ==
=== Design and creation ===
Howard intended to convert the land into a "wilderness" and formal gardens for walking and recreation. As Henry Howard drew up plans to rebuild the Duke's Palace in a modern style, wanting to remain on the same site, he additionally decided to plan a garden on other land he had come to own by the River Wensum. He wanted a pleasure garden that was to be approached by water, to which Howard's guests and the dignitaries of the city could be rowed, and chose Evelyn to design it.

In Autumn 1663, Tuke wrote to Evelyn that "Mr Howard has given 700L for a plott of ground to make a spring garden at Norwich". Tuke later sent a plan of the former Austin Friars site to Evelyn on the Norwich coach to London. It said that Howard:

desires your advice how he shall dispose it for a Garden to entertaine the good company in the Towne. He intends to have in it a Bowling ground & the rest to be cast into walks with fruit trees against the walls, with such pert words as you shall judge propper, the figure is irregular but that is not to be helped. Therefore I pray combine it the best you can.

In October, Tuke wrote to Mary Evelyn that Howard was coming to London and wanted to "speake with Mr Evelyn about the contrivance of his garden; but for my part I shall be frozen up all this winter in Norwich". Howard did not visit however, and Tuke wrote to Evelyn in late October to tell him to be patient as "the plott of the garden it will keepe colde". The outline of the garden, based on Evelyn's plan, was sketched out on the ground by December 1663, according to Thomas Browne who also wrote that Howard intended:

a place for walking and recreations, having made already walkes round and crosse it, forty foot in breadth. If the quadrangle left bee spatious enough hee intends the first of them for a fishpond, the second for a bowling green, the third for a wildernesse, and the forth for a Garden. These & the like noble things hee performeth and yet hath payed 100000 of his Ancesters debts.

While there is no further documentary evidence of John Evelyn's involvement in the garden, it appears the described plans were partially carried out by January under Evelyn's instruction from afar, as Browne confirmed after visiting the site on 16 January 1664 that "My Lord's Garden" was taking shape.

=== As a pleasure garden ===
While John Evelyn did visit the Duke's Palace during a 1671 royal visit, he did not comment on the gardens at all; it is not known whether he ever visited My Lord's Garden. It is known that Evelyn had begun to fall out with the Duke around this time. By the 1680s, the garden was a notable feature of Norwich. Topographer Thomas Baskerville was rowed to the garden in 1681 and had a pleasant impression of what he described as a "fair garden" that had "handsome stairs leading to the water by which we ascended into the garden and saw a good bowling-green, and many fine walks". Baskerville was given "good liquors and fruits" by the gardener, and wrote that he thought this was where the Duke's Palace should have been rebuilt.

It survived for years longer than the Duke's Palace, which was demolished for 1711 to 1714. In the 1730s, Francis Blomefield described the garden as "some time sold", though its high stone walls and two acres of orchards and gardens remained intact.

=== St Anne's Quarter ===
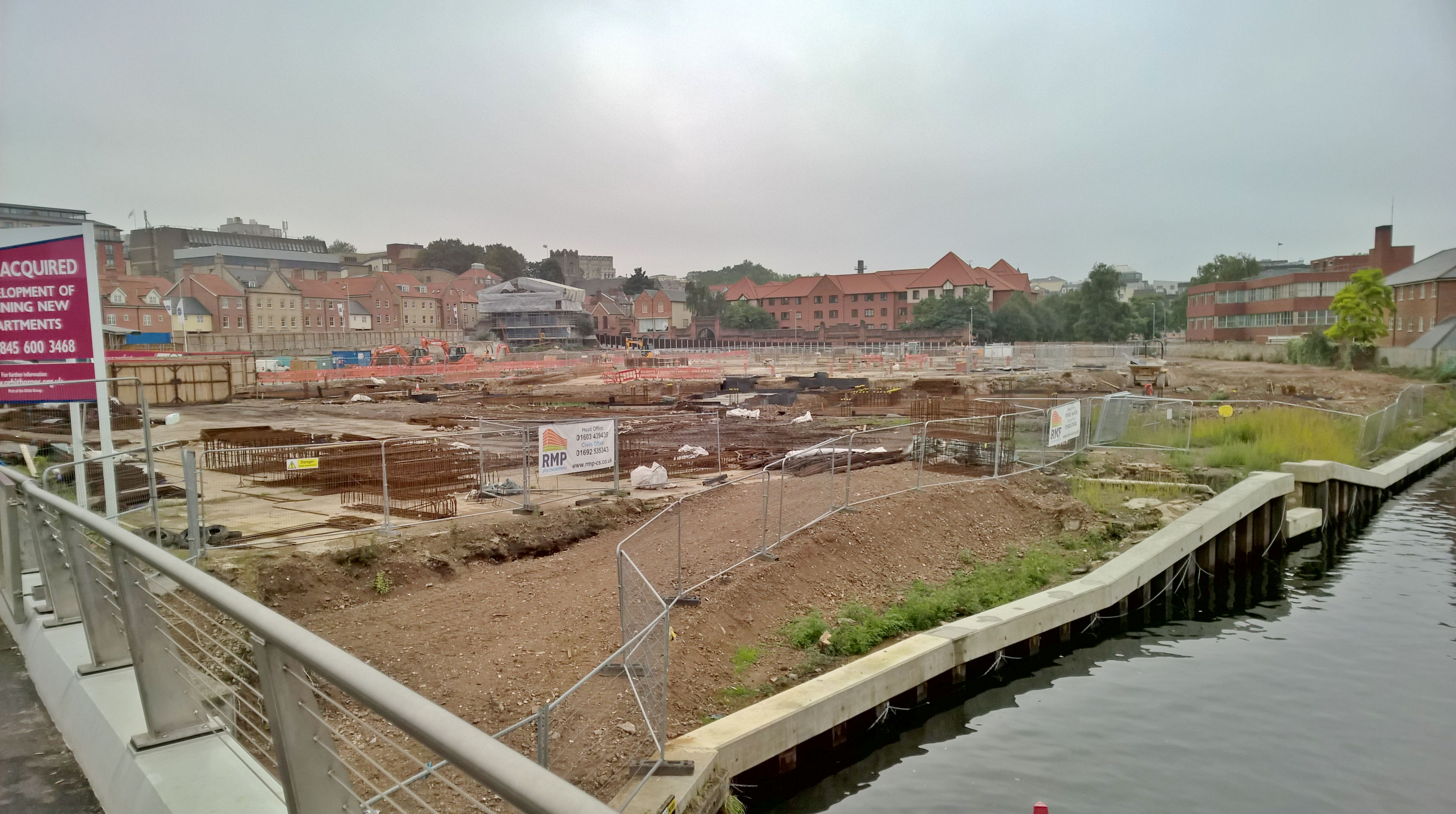
Redevelopment of the site into St Anne's Quarter in 2016

As of 2019, the site was being redeveloped into a housing development names St Anne's Quarter after being acquired by Obit Homes. Howard's House is still present, with one of the conditions for planning permission for the development being the restoration of the house.
