= Duke's Palace, Norwich =

Demolished palace in Norwich, England

Duke's Palace
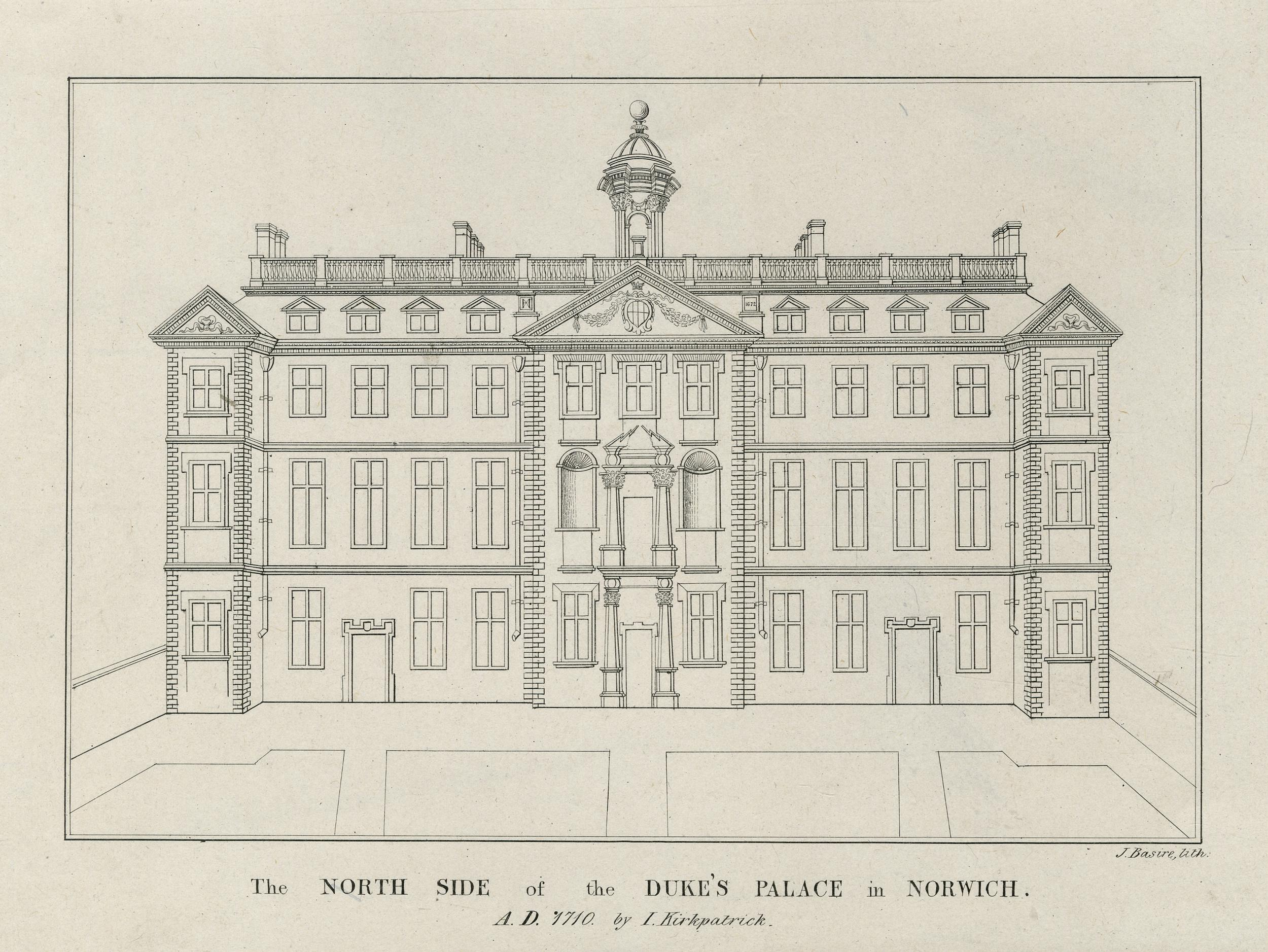
- c. 1811–1840 lithograph of the north facade of Duke's Palace facing the River Wensum, based on John Kirkpatrick's 1710 drawing of the building
- Interactive map of the Duke's Palace area

General information
- Status: Demolished
- Location: Norwich, England
- Coordinates: 52.63108°N 1.29330°E
- Grid position: TG 2296 0879
- Year built: 1561–1567
- Renovated: 1672
- Demolished: 1711–1714

The Duke's Palace was the palatial seat of the Duke of Norfolk in Norwich, England. It was located close to Norwich's Charing Cross in the parish of St John Maddermarket. Built from 1561 to 1567 and enlarged in the 1660s under Henry Howard, 6th Duke of Norfolk, it housed a royal visit from King Charles II of England in 1671, and was rebuilt in a modern style in 1672, also under Howard.

The palace was known to quickly deteriorate and was prone to subsidence due to its location very close to the River Wensum, on boggy ground. Despite praise for the house itself, its location in a more industrialised area of the city was deemed unpleasant by its contemporaries. It was abandoned by 1711 and then largely demolished between then and 1714, its remainder becoming a workhouse before it was fully demolished in the 19th century. A multi-storey car park now exists in its place.

== History ==
According to Leonard G. Bolingbroke and William C. Ewing, whose citations are partial, the site on which the palace was built was property of Richard Hoste – Sheriff of Norwich in 1462 and Member of Parliament in 1467 – until he died in 1467. The property was then passed to Alan Percy, Rector of Mulbarton who was rated for the land in 1558, and Percy then sold it to one Thomas Howard, Duke of Norfolk.

=== 1561–1645: Construction and early years ===
The Duke's Palace was built between 1561 and 1567. The palace and its gardens were described in 1563 as "a capital messuage new built with buildings, courts, orchards, gardens, ponds and vineyards". The front of the Duke's Palace could be approached through a gatehouse and then an entrance courtyard that had fountains, with a further two courts after this. Much of the space around the house was taken up by an almost 200-foot (61 m) bowling alley which went from the house to the waterside.

=== 1645–1684: Residence of Henry Howard, 6th Duke of Norfolk ===
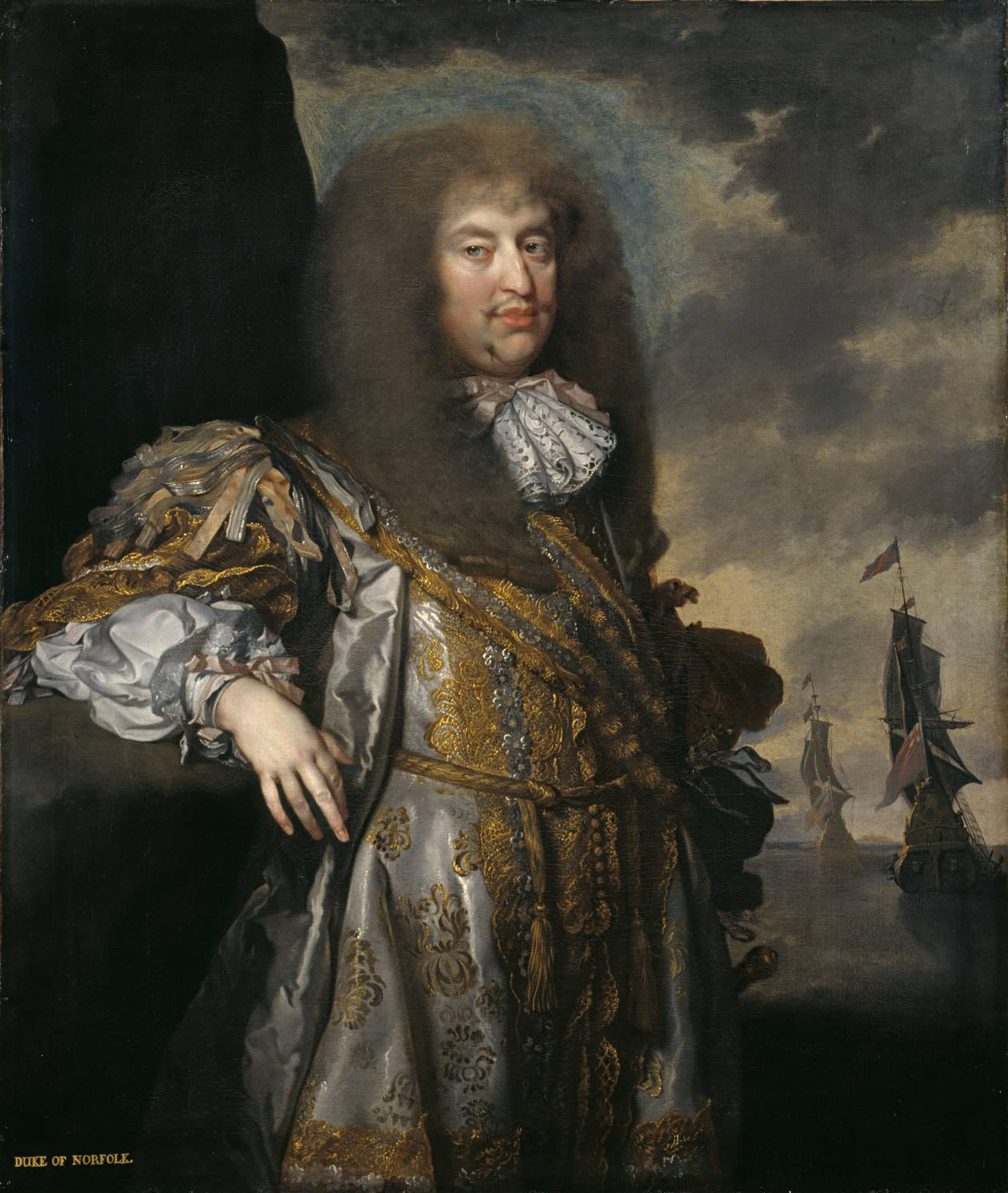
Lord Henry Howard, 6th Duke of Norfolk in 1670

At least by the 17th century, while gentry families were clustering in the parish of St Peter Mancroft, the Palace remained in the Mid-Wymer ward. Lord Henry Howard, who would later be the 6th Duke of Norfolk, lived in the palace prior to becoming a duke; since 1645, his brother Thomas Howard, 5th Duke of Norfolk was living under restraint in Padua, considered 'non compos mentis'. The palace by 1645 had been neglected for years, and was in poor structural condition. This was made worse by its positioning too close to the River Wensum, which was causing the cellars to regularly flood. Henry Howard devised plans to rebuild the palace in a modern style, being an accomplished amateur architect himself though possibly recruiting Robert Hooke, planning to stay on the same site while making up for a lack of space for outdoor entertainment by commissioning a pleasure garden known as My Lord's Garden.

For Christmas 1663, celebrations were had which Norwich-based philosopher Dr Thomas Browne was present. Browne described the decorations in the palace:

so magnificently as the like hath scarce been seen; they had dauncing every night and gave entertainments to all that would come & hee build up a roome on purpose to dance in very large, and hunge with the bravest hangings I ever saw, his candlesticks, snuffers, tongues, fireshovels, andirons were silver a banquet was given every night after dancing.

He also described the collection at the palace:

prints and draughts done by most of the great masters own hands. Stones and jewels [...] the more and better than any prince in Europe rings and seals [...] all manner of stones and limnings beyond compare these things were most of them collected by the old Earl of Arundel who employed his agents in most places to buy him up rarities, but especially in Greece and Italy.

The 1671 hearth tax in Norwich recorded the Duke's Palace, now in the parish of St John Maddermarket, as the property with the highest number of hearths in the city with a total of 60. In Autumn that year, King Charles II and visited Norwich and stayed at the Duke's Palace. For this visit, contemporaries noted the large amount of work needed to get the house ready; Town clerk Thomas Corie wrote that while the Duke was 'no stranger' to Norwich, he had taken long absences which had left the house neither "finished or in order" by the time of the visit, meaning that the Duke was "forced [...] to post hither out of Yorkshire to prepare". The house and outbuildings had been converted to accommodate the royal courts of the King, Queen and Duke of York, with the former tennis court becoming its kitchen and the bowling alley becoming the dining rooms. Duke's Palace Gardens were instead equipped with a covered bowling alley, tennis court and playhouse. The Queen extended her stay at the palace to three nights prior to her return to Euston. During this journey, John Evelyn wrote that Howard had "advised with me concerning a plot to rebuild his house, having already as he said erected a front next the streete, and a left wing, and now resolving to set up another wing and pavilion next the garden". However, Evelyn also wrote that the palace was a "wretched building, & that part of it, newly built of brick, is very ill understood [...] it had ben much better to have demolish'd all". He suggested Howard move to a different site nearer Norwich Castle. The royal visit marked the last time the house would be seen at the height of its prowess.

==== Rebuilding ====
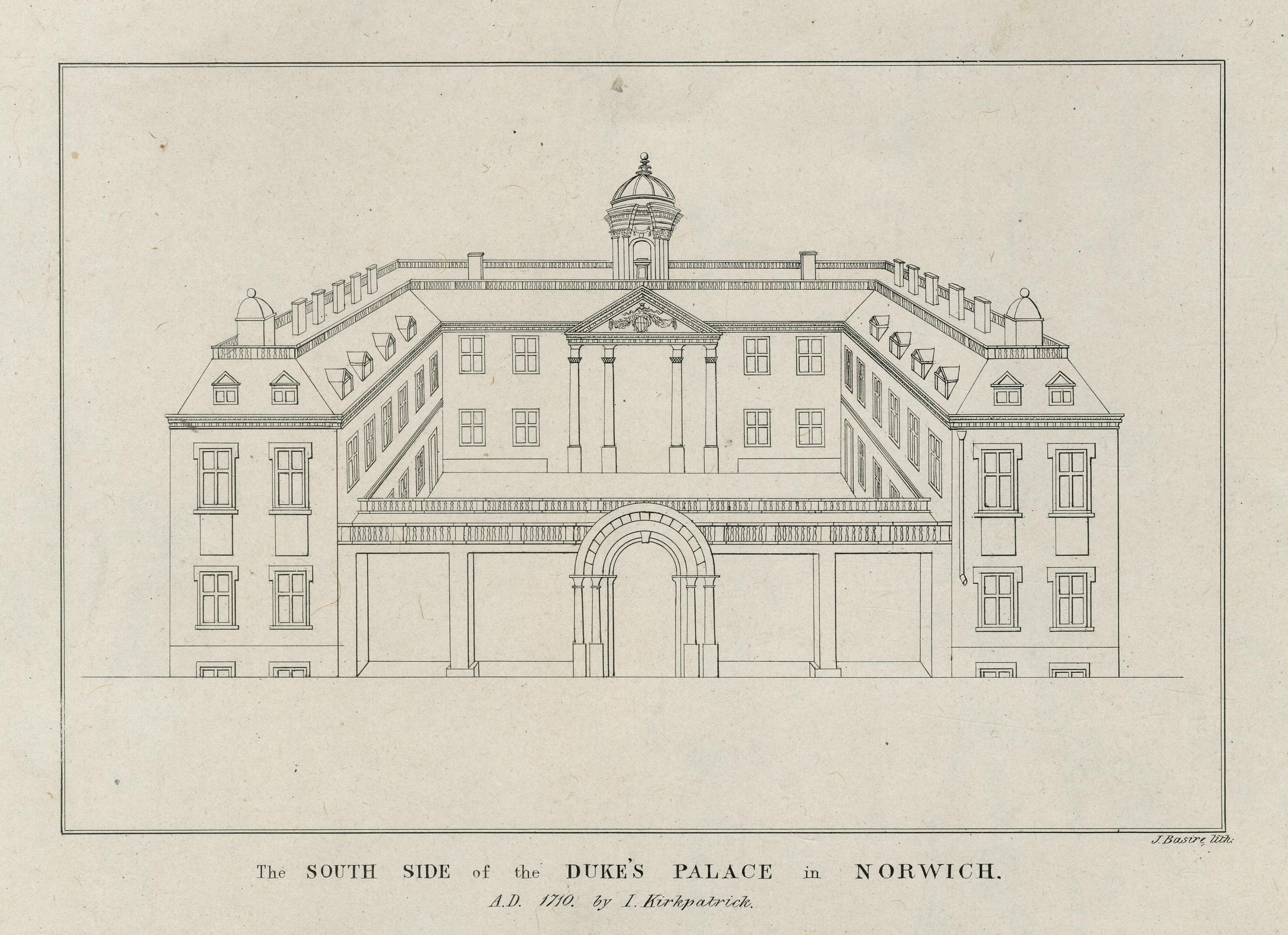
A c. 1811–1840 lithograph of the south facade of Duke's Palace, based on John Kirkpatrick's drawing of the building a year before demolition began

Howard eventually rebuilt the palace at a cost of around £30,000, an effort executed in 1681. Topographer Thomas Baskerville visited in 1681 and described it as "sumptuous", though located in a "dunghole place" with "little room for gardens and is pent upon all sides both on this and the other side of the river with tradesmen and dyers's houses who foul the water by their constant washing and cleaning of their cloth". He was of the opinion that the house should have been rebuilt on the site of My Lord's Garden.

=== 1687–1714: Decline and demolition ===
The palace was again crumbling by the mid-1680s, and by the end of the 17th century, the house remained in a poor state. Celia Fiennes saw during her 1696 visit to Norwich that the palace was spoiling the city centre, and antiquarian John Kirkpatrick wrote of the house's poor drainage, mentioning that "its great fault was sinking in the cellars too deep that the water annoyed them much."

The house was abandoned by 1711, though its gardens saw continued use. Following a quarrel with the Norwich Corporation that year, Thomas Howard, 8th Duke of Norfolk ordered it to be demolished, and this was mostly carried out between then and 1714 with its materials being reclaimed and sold for a fraction of their original cost. Some parts of the house were retained and sold to the Corporation.

== Legacy ==
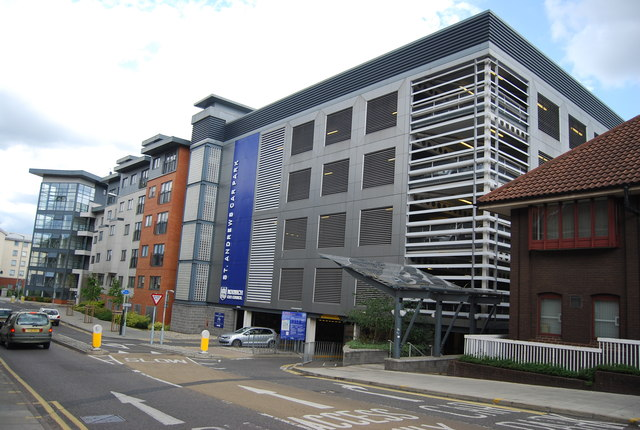
The present site from the west, taken up by St Andrew's Car Park

The remaining parts of the house became a workhouse in the 18th century. 19th-century building work destroyed all that survived its initial demolition, aside from its foundations. One commemoration to the building was the naming of Duke Street, the 19th-century route to a new bridge.

In 1974, the site of the palace was excavated prior to the construction of an extension to the neighbouring multi-storey car park by Norwich City Corporation. These discovered the former marsh with some 11th–16th century material as well as material from the first building, the palace's massive brick and flint foundations, partially supported on timber piles.
