= Monkton House =

House in Broughton Gifford, Wiltshire, England

Coordinates: 51°21′36″N 2°10′07″W

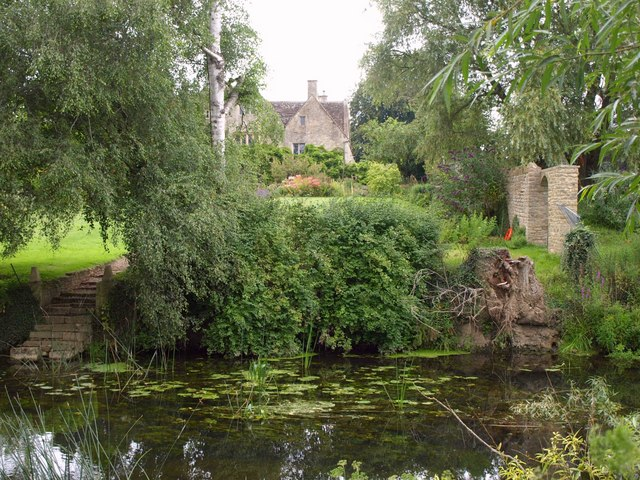
Monkton House

Monkton House in Broughton Gifford, Wiltshire, England is a Grade II* listed 16th-century house.

== History ==
In the 12th century Cluniac monks of the Order of Saint Benedict founded a monastery at Monkton Farleigh, acquiring land in the neighbourhood. On the Dissolution of the Monasteries the priory and abbey land, including the manor of Monkton, were given to Sir Edward Seymour, 1st Earl of Hertford. Seymour leased it in 1600 to Edward Long, son of a wealthy Wiltshire clothier, Henry Long of Whaddon. Edward had already purchased the manor of Rood Ashton three years before.

Long later bought the house on 15 May 1615 and left it to his two sons Edward and John, who occupied it in succession. John appears to have carried out an extensive building programme in or around 1647 (marked by a plaque on the wall of the house) involving repairs, alterations, re-roofing and an extension on the eastern side. A chimney-piece with heavy carving, believed to be part of an altar tomb from Monkton Farleigh Priory is in one of the bedrooms.

At some point during the English Civil War the household was forced to accommodate soldiers fighting for Cromwell's Parliamentarian army. Possibly John's building programme stretched his finances as he was labelled a delinquent (1649–50) and his estate was sequestered. He was succeeded by his son Thomas Long of Rowden in Chippenham (died 1691), the estate was secured, and continued in the Long family until 10 May 1669 when Thomas sold it to Sir James Thynne of Longleat. However, Thomas appears to have continued to rent the property until 1671. William Thynne then appears as the owner.

The house is currently owned by the Kirk family.
