= Inwood, Warleigh =

Protected area in Wiltshire, England

Coordinates: 51.36840°N 2.28868°W

Inwood, Warleigh (grid reference ST800633) is a 56.9 hectare biological Site of Special Scientific Interest in Wiltshire, notified in 1988.

Although the nearest village is Warleigh in Somerset, the site is in the parish of Monkton Farleigh in Wiltshire.

== Sources ==
- Natural England citation sheet for the site (accessed 07 April 2022)
