= John Jewel =

English clergyman (1522–1571)

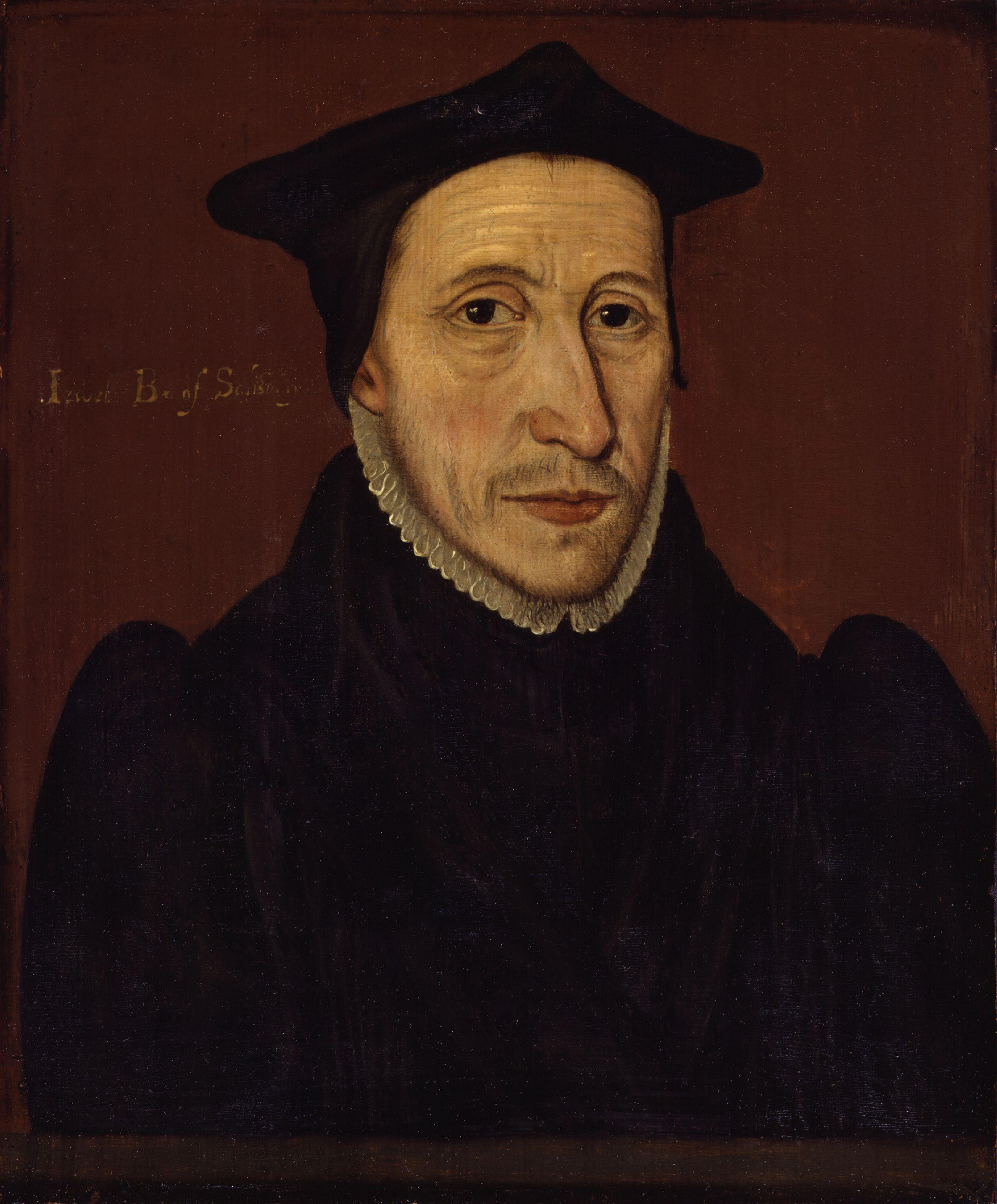
- Born: May 24, 1522; Berrynarbor, Devon
- Died: September 23, 1571 (aged 49); Monkton Farleigh, Wiltshire
- Education: Merton College, Oxford and Corpus Christi College, Oxford
- Occupation: Bishop of Salisbury
- Known for: Author of the Apology of the Church of England

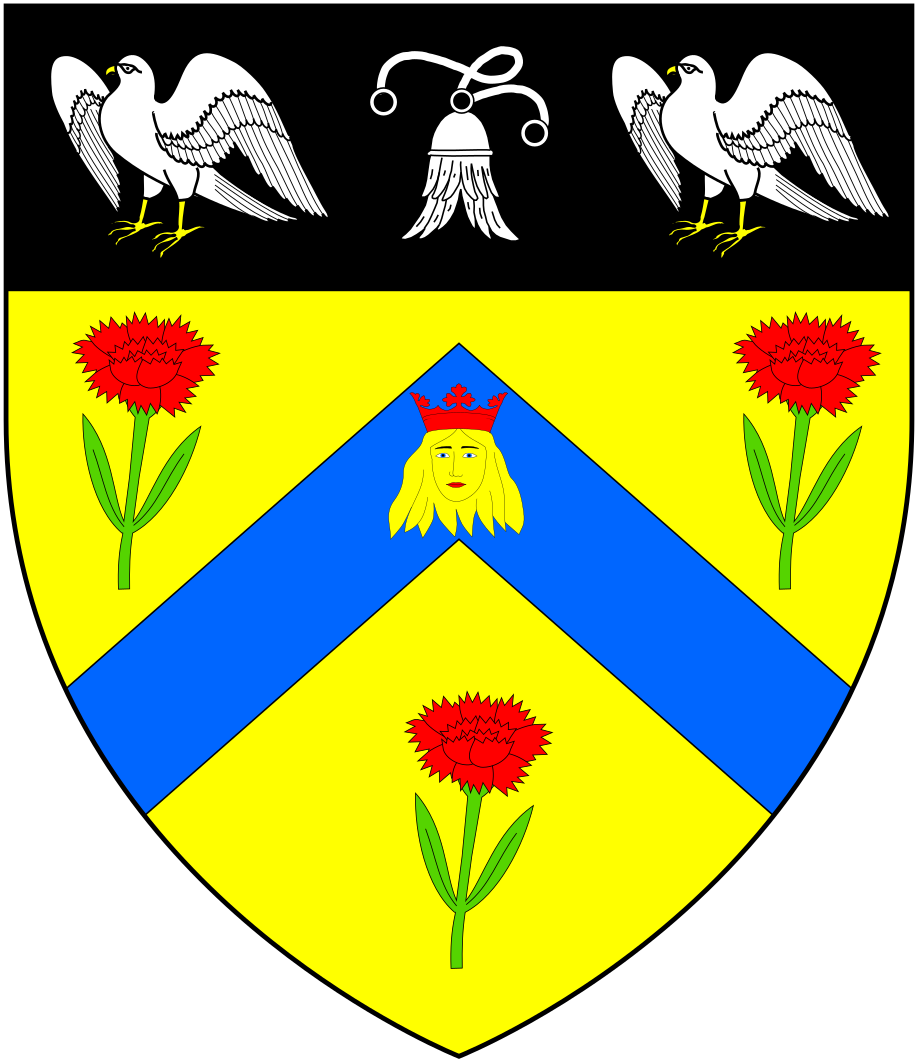
Arms of Jewel: Or, on a chevron azure between three gillyflowers gules stalked and leaved vert a maiden's head of the first ducally crowned of the third on a chief sable a hawk's lure double stringed between two falcons argent beaked and legged of the first

John Jewel (alias Jewell) (24 May 1522 – 23 September 1571) of Devon, England was Bishop of Salisbury from 1559 to 1571.

== Life ==
He was the youngest son of John Jewel of Bowden in the parish of Berry Narbor in Devon, by his wife Alice Bellamye, daughter of Richard Bellamye. He was educated under his uncle John Bellamy, rector of Hampton, and other private tutors until his matriculation at Merton College, Oxford, in July 1535.

There he was taught by John Parkhurst, afterwards bishop of Norwich; but on 19 August 1539 he was elected scholar of Corpus Christi College, Oxford. He graduated BA in 1540 and MA in 1545, having been elected fellow of his college in 1542.

He made some mark as a teacher at Oxford, and became after 1547 one of the chief disciples of Pietro Martire Vermigli, known in England as Peter Martyr. He graduated BD in 1552, and was made vicar of Sunningwell to the south of Oxford, and public orator of the university, in which capacity he had to compose a congratulatory epistle to Queen Mary on her accession.

In April 1554 he acted as notary to Cranmer and Ridley at their disputation, but in the autumn he signed a series of Catholic articles. He was, nevertheless, suspected, fled to London, and thence to Frankfurt, which he reached in March 1555. There he sided with Cox against Knox in what would later be called the Troubles at Frankfurt. However, he soon joined Martyr at Strasbourg, accompanied him to Zürich, and then paid a visit to Padua.

=== Reign of Queen Elizabeth I ===
Upon Elizabeth's succession he returned to England, and made earnest efforts to secure what would now be called the Elizabethan Settlement. His attitude was strongly distinguishable from that of the Elizabethan Puritans, as he gradually formulated it under the stress of office and responsibility. In his last sermon his strongly argued against the Puritan faction as worse than the Roman Catholic disputants he was opposing.

He was one of the disputants selected to confute the "Romanists" (the Roman Catholics) at the Westminster Conference of 1559 after Easter 1559; he was selected preacher at St Paul's Cross in London on 15 June; and in the autumn was engaged as one of the royal visitors of the western counties. His appointment as Bishop of Salisbury had been made out on 27 July, but he was not consecrated until 21 January 1560.

He now constituted himself the literary defender of the Elizabethan Settlement. He had on 26 November 1559, in a sermon at St Paul's Cross, challenged all comers to prove the Roman Catholic case out of the Scriptures, or the councils or Fathers of the first six hundred years after Christ. He repeated his challenge in 1560, and Dr. Henry Cole, priest, took it up. The "Great Controversy" that followed would give rise to sixty-four polemical exchanges and it set the tone and content of much subsequent debate between English Reformers and Roman Catholic writers.

Jewel continued to present the case for the Church of England from public pulpits, particularly Paul's Cross, in the year's following 'the Challenge sermon'.

One of the chief results of these exchanges was Jewel's Apologia ecclesiae Anglicanae (the Apology of the Anglican Church), published in 1562, which in Bishop Mandell Creighton's words is the first methodical statement of the position of the Church of England against the Roman Catholic Church, and forms the groundwork of all subsequent controversy. A translation of the Apologia ecclesiae Anglicanae into English by Anne Bacon in 1564 allowed it to reach a wider audience and was a significant step in the intellectual justification of the Church of England.

=== Later years ===
A more formidable antagonist than Cole now entered the lists in the person of Thomas Harding, an Oxford contemporary whom Jewel had deprived of his prebend in Salisbury Cathedral for recusancy. He published an elaborate and bitter Answer in 1564, to which Jewel issued a "Reply" in 1565. Harding followed with a Confutation, and Jewel with a Defence of the Apology in 1566 and 1567; the combatants ranged over the whole field of the Anglo-Roman controversy.

Latterly Jewel had been confronted with criticism from a different quarter. The arguments that had weaned him from the Puritan Zwinglian worldviews did not satisfy his some English nonconformists, and Jewel had to refuse admission to a benefice to his friend Lawrence Humphrey, who would not wear a surplice.

He was consulted a good deal by the government on such questions as England's attitude towards the Council of Trent, and political considerations made him more and more hostile to Puritan demands with which he had previously clashed. He wrote an attack on Thomas Cartwright, which was published after his death by Whitgift.

Collapsing after a sermon at Lacock, Wiltshire, he was taken to the episcopal manor house of Monkton Farleigh where he died on 23 September 1571. He was buried in Salisbury Cathedral, where he had built a library. Richard Hooker, who speaks of Jewel as the "worthiest divine that Christendom hath bred for some hundreds of years," was one of the boys whom Jewel prepared in his house for the university; and his Ecclesiastical Polity owes much to Jewel's training.

=== Legacy ===
Jewel's works were published in a folio in 1609 under the direction of Richard Bancroft, the Archbishop of Canterbury, who ordered the Apology to be placed in churches, in some of which it may still be seen chained to the lectern; other editions appeared at Oxford (1848, 8 vols) and Cambridge (Parker Soc., 4 vols). See also Gough's Index to Parker Soc. Publ.; John Strype's Works (General Index); Calendars of Domestic and Spanish State Papers; Dixon's and Frere's Church Histories; and Dictionary of National Biography (article by Bishop Creighton).

A house at Bishop Wordsworth's School in Salisbury is named for him. The houses are all named after famous Bishops of Salisbury: John Jewell (using alternative spelling), Martival, Osmund, Poore and Ward.

== Jewel's Apology of the Church of England ==
After the theological pioneering of Luther, Melanchthon, Zwingli, Calvin, and the other first-tier reformers, the Reformation became less about the theologies of individuals and more about the religion and politics of nations, kingdoms, and continents.

John Jewel's 1562 Apology of the Church of England, a document more important in its political-historical significance than its theological significance, represents an attempt to provide a statement of faith for the Church of England under Elizabeth I and answer challenges and accusations of the Romanists against the Protestants.

For these causes, I say, we have thought fit, by this book, to give an account of our faith, and to answer truly and publicly, what hath been publicly objected against us, that the whole world may see the parts and reasons of that faith, which so many good men have valued above their lives, and that all mankind may understand what kind of men they are, and what they think of God and religion . . . . (I.10)

In this way, the Apology serves to allow everyone to

determine with themselves, whether that faith which they must needs perceive to be consonant to the words of Christ and the writings of the apostles, and the testimonies of the catholic fathers, and which is confirmed by the examples of many ages, be only the rage of a sort of madmen, and a combination or conspiracy of heretics. (I.17)

Answering accusations of heresy and "tumultuous defection," among others, Jewel attempts to establish the truth and legitimacy of the claims of not only the Church of England but the whole protestant reformation by arguing that there is continuity between the reformers and Scripture, the apostles (especially, Paul), the Church Fathers (i.e., Augustine, Tertullian, Ambrose, Jerome, etc.), and church councils. Says Jewel, "Thus we have been taught by Christ, by the apostles and holy fathers; and we do faithfully teach the people of God the same things . . ." (III.2).

At the core of the Apology is a defence of the scriptural basis of authority in the Church of England against the Catholic claim that the Church had authority to define doctrine. In tone and approach, this section is reminiscent of the Augsburg Confession, a 1530 document written primarily by Philip Melanchthon throughout which he had maintained a strong emphasis that the reforming movement was no new sect or cult and had added no new or heretical doctrines: "Our churches dissent in no article of the faith from the Church Catholic, but only omit some abuses which are new, and which have been erroneously accepted by the corruption of the times." In this spirit, the Apology begins its statement of doctrine in its second section with an exposition and affirmation of the Nicene Creed. Facing charges of heresy, many Protestant reformers realised that establishing their orthodoxy was paramount.

=== More than soteriology ===
Unlike the Augsburg Confession, Jewel's Apology is much more interested in doctrines and issues concerning the church than in soteriology. Apology never treats grace, predestination, election, or justification per se. The most explicit and important statement of soteriology in the piece—and one of the few statements concerning soteriology—amounts to a basic summary of the reformers' view of soteriology and concomitant views of man, works, the law, and Christ.

We say that man is born in sin and leadeth his life in sin, and that no man can truly say his heart is clean; that the most holy man is an unprofitable servant; that the law of God is perfect, and requires of us a full and perfect obedience; and that we cannot in any way keep it perfectly in this life; and that there is no mortal who can be justified in the sight of God by his own deserts; and therefore our only refuge and safety is in the mercy of God the Father, by Jesus Christ, and in the assuring ourselves that he is the propitiation for our sins, by whose blood all our stains are washed out; that he has pacified all things by the blood of his cross; that he by that only sacrifice which he once offered upon the cross, hath perfected all things; and therefore, when he breathed out his soul, he said, IT IS FINISHED; as if by these words he would signify, Now the price is paid for the sins of mankind. (II.21)

In this statement, we see continuities with the early Protestant reformers and sharp discontinuity with the late medieval Catholic theologians (e.g., Gabriel Biel, Robert Holcot) of the via moderna. This is most evident in Jewel's doctrine of man, or anthropology.

We can see evidence of Luther's totus homo anthropology and corollary view that the Christian is simul iustus et peccator. Jewel implies these views and causes a number of questions when he says that "no man can truly say his heart is clean," that "the most holy man is an unprofitable servant," and that "we cannot in any way keep it [the law] perfectly in this life." Of these statements, the first two are ambiguous. In the first statement, Jewel is not clear on the word "man." "Man" may refer either to the saved only or to both the saved and the unsaved.

The second of these statements contains a similar ambiguity in the phrase "the most holy man." This could refer either to the Christian who lives generally well or to the person who is not saved but who only acts righteous outwardly. If the latter is the case, it may represent something like the "civil righteousness" discussed in the Augsburg Confession.

Nevertheless, the third statement clearly evidences simul iustus et peccator and thus a totus homo anthropology. In this statement, Jewel is clearly referring to Christians. This is apparent when Jewel begins using first-person pronouns and when he says that no one is able to obey the law in this life (i.e., before glorification, when man will become unable to sin).

=== Salvation treated ===
Second, Jewel, like the early Protestants, maintains that man, because of original sin and his corrupt nature, possesses no soteriological resources. Man can produce no good or meritorious works, and so "there is no trust to be put in the merits of our works and actions" (II.23). Consequently, "no mortal who can be justified in the sight of God by his own deserts," and so man must hope and trust in Christ for his salvation.

Such a doctrine of man completely uproots and destroys the whole theology of the via moderna. For, the moderni hold that "God will not deny his grace to the man who does quod in se est ["what lies within oneself"]"; and yet, if, as Luther sees it, quod in se est is corrupt and evil, it is impossible for man to earn, or even initiate, salvation.

Jewel makes it clear that salvation comes by faith in Christ. "It is our faith," he says, "which applies the death and cross of Christ to us" (II.17). Jewel defines a true, saving faith as a "living faith" (II.23). When Jewel treats the sacraments, he emphasises that not the sacraments themselves but the faith of the individual effects salvation. On this point, Jewel appeals to several church fathers:

'The faith of the sacraments,' saith St. Augustine, 'justifies, and not the sacrament.' And Origen saith, 'He (Christ) is the priest and the propitiation, and the sacrifice; and that propitiation comes to every one by way of faith.' And, therefore, agreeably hereunto, we say that the sacraments of Christ do not profit the living without faith (II.17).

Similarly, Jewel says, "For although we do not touch Christ with our teeth and lips, yet we hold and press him by faith, mind, and spirit" (II.15).

But Jewel is no antinomian or abuser of Christian freedom, for a true and living faith "is not idle" but, as Paul says in Ephesians 2:10, is called unto good works. "Christ himself dwelleth in our hearts by faith," Jewel says, and Christians are called to sanctification (II.23).

Much of Jewel's Apology concerns doctrine of the church. Concerning the role of the clergy, Jewel on the one hand rails against the Roman Catholic practices of sacerdotalism and refutes the pope's claim to be the "vicar general of Christ," but on the other hand maintains a need for specially called clergy.

Jewel lists three church offices: deacon, presbyter, and bishop. The pope, who is more technically the bishop of Rome, must not be regarded as the "vicar general of Christ" or in any sense the foundation of the church but as equal to the other patriarchs in the church. The pope has become too powerful, says Jewel, and "usurps a power which belongs not to him." He should be judged only by how well he executes the function of the office of bishop—that is, instructing, admonishing, and teaching the people and administering the sacraments.

Like Luther in his 1520 work On the Babylonian Captivity of the Church, Jewel says (referencing Augustine) that "bishop is the name of a work or office, and not a title of honour; so that he who would usurp an unprofitable preeminence in the church is no bishop" (II.6, 304). Moreover, Jewel, like Luther, compares the pope to "Lucifer" and says the pope has "become the forerunner of antichrist" (II.6).

=== Sacramental theology ===
Jewel's sacramental theology follows the early Protestant reformers, such as Luther and Calvin. Jewel defines sacraments as "the sacred signs and ceremonies which Christ commanded us to use, that he might by them represent to our eyes the mysteries of our salvation, and most strongly confirm the faith we have in his blood, and seal in our hearts his grace" (II.11). This is especially close to Calvin's own definition of a sacrament.

Like the early Protestants, Jewel recognises two sacraments, baptism and the Eucharist. Baptism is a sacrament of the remission of sins, representing the Christian's being washed in Christ's blood (II.13). The Eucharist is a sacrament of the body and blood of Christ, representing the death and resurrection of Christ (II.14). It serves to remind Christians of Christ's sacrifice and thereby to nourish hope of the resurrection and of eternal life.

Concerning the nature of the Eucharistic elements, the Apology is slightly vague, although its position seems to be somewhere between Luther's sacramental union and the Calvin's spiritual presence. Says Jewel, "The bread and wine are the holy and heavenly mysteries of the body and blood of Christ; and . . . in them Christ himself . . . is so exhibited to us as present, that we do by faith truly take his body and blood" (II.15). "We assert that Christ in his sacraments doth exhibit himself truly present. In baptism, that we may put him on; in his supper that we may eat him by faith and in the spirit; and that by his cross and blood we may have life eternal" (II.15).

Except for section II, the Apology reads like Luther's Babylonian Captivity. It devotes considerable attention to criticising the manifold abuses and corruptions in the Roman Catholic Church. Such issues include marriage of clergy, which Jewel allows (II.9); sacerdotalism, a category of offence which would include, for example, making the mass a sacrifice; veneration of saints, which the Apology denounces (II.20); private absolution, which it denies (II.8); and the language of the mass, which Jewel says should be in the vernacular (II.19).

The Church of England has broken from Roman Catholic church, which, Jewel says, has departed from Scripture, the church fathers, and church councils; and Jewel asserts that the Protestant churches are the revival of the true Christian church (Conclusion.1).

We have departed from that church, which they had made a den of thieves, in which they had left nothing sound or like a church, and which they themselves confessed to have erred in many things, as Lot left Sodom, or Abraham Chaldea, not out of contention, but out of obedience to God; and have sought the certain way of religion out of the sacred Scriptures, which we know cannot deceive us, and have returned to the primitive church of the ancient fathers and apostles, that is, to the beginning a first rise of the church, as to the proper fountain. (Conclusion.1)

But while Jewel's Apology makes clear the theological and religious reasons for the defection of the Church of England, the English Reformation was to a greater extent driven by politics than was, for example, the German Reformation, which began in one man's tumultuous and uncertain conscience. Jewel's Apology of the Church of England provides a good and valuable purview of the central issues—both religious and secular—of the English Reformation and the Reformation as a whole.

=== Translation in Czech language ===
Jewel's Apology has been translated in Czech language and printed in Prague in 1619, during the Bohemian Revolt. The title of the translation is Apologia, to jest dostečná obrana víry a náboženství církví evangelických.

== Works ==
A list of Jewel's works is set out below:

- Iohn Iewel (1584). An Exposition vpon the Two Epistles of the Apostle S. Paul to the Thessalonians, by the Reuerend Father Iohn Iewel, Late Bishop of Sarisbvrie. Whereunto is Adioined a Very Necessarie Table of the Principal Matters Contained in this Exposition. London: Printed by Ralfe Newberie. OCLC 228716311.

Church of England titles
Preceded by Francis Mallet	Bishop of Salisbury; 1559–1571	Succeeded by Edmund Gheast
