= St Mary's Priory, Mendham =

Coordinates: 52°23′17″N 1°19′18″E

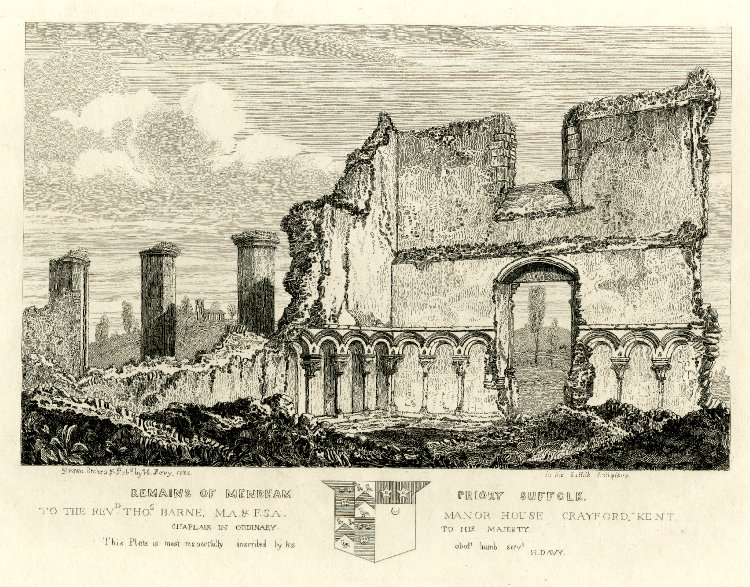
Remains of Mendham Priory, Suffolk by Henry Davy

St Mary's Priory, Mendham was a Cluniac priory located on the River Waveney, the border of Norfolk and Suffolk. All of it that remains in the 21st century is a single piece of masonry alongside a pile of rubble.

The Priory was founded by William de Huntingfield who gave the isle of St. Mary of Mendham to the monks of Castle Acre Priory.
