= Thomas Baskerville (topographer) =

English topographer

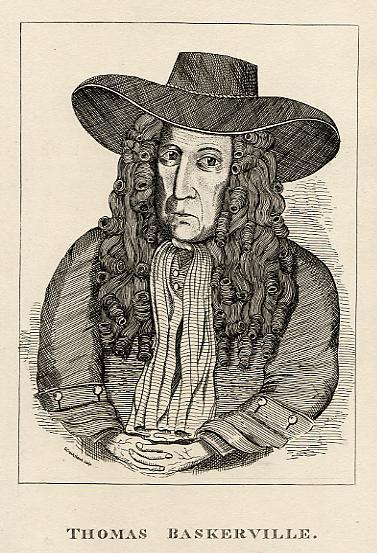

Thomas Baskerville (1630–1720), was an English topographer.

== Life ==
Baskerville was the fourth son of the antiquary Hannibal Baskerville. He was born at Bayworth House, Sunningwell, near Abingdon, in 1630, since, according to the "Visitation of Berkshire", his age on 16 March 1664 was thirty-four.

He wrote an account of a journey which he made through several English counties in England in 1677 and 1678; and a part of his manuscript relating to Wiltshire, Oxfordshire, and Gloucestershire is still preserved in the Harleian Collection. This journal, though referred to by several of his contemporaries, mainly consists of short notes of the towns and places visited by the writer, interspersed with epitaphs copied in churchyards, and some doggerel verse.

He died on 9 February 1720.
