= Monkton Farleigh =

Village in Wiltshire, England

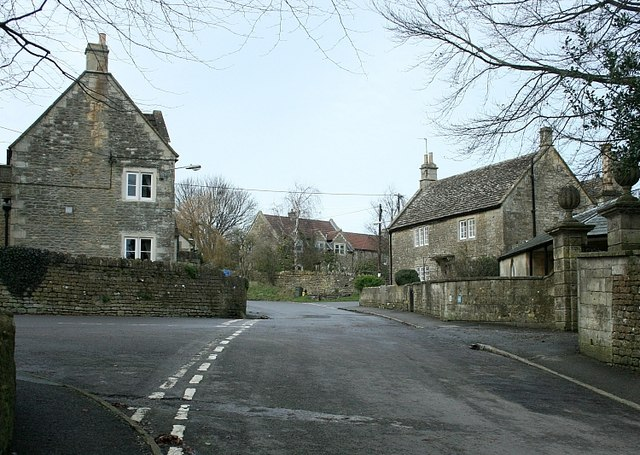
- Houses in Monkton Farleigh

- Location within Wiltshire
- Population: 460 (2011 census)
- OS grid reference: ST805655
- Civil parish: Monkton Farleigh
- Unitary authority: Wiltshire
- Ceremonial county: Wiltshire
- Region: South West
- Country: England
- Sovereign state: United Kingdom
- Post town: Bradford-on-Avon
- Postcode district: BA15
- Dialling code: 01225
- Police: Wiltshire
- Fire: Dorset and Wiltshire
- Ambulance: South Western
- UK Parliament: Melksham and Devizes
- Website: Parish Council

Monkton Farleigh is a village and civil parish in west Wiltshire, England, on high ground 3 miles (5 km) northwest of Bradford-on-Avon, and a similar distance east of the city of Bath. The parish includes the hamlets of Farleigh Wick and Pinckney Green. In the west and northwest the parish is bounded by Somerset.

It is known for its underground mines of Bath stone, which were converted into one of the largest Ministry of Defence underground ammunition stores in the country.

== History ==
The Roman road from Silchester to Bath, and later earthworks which may be part of Wansdyke, run east–west and form the northern boundary of the modern parish. Domesday Book of 1086 recorded a settlement of 24 households, and land held by Brictric and his brother Alwy.

The manor passed to the Bohun family, and was held by Humphrey I de Bohun around 1120. The Bohuns founded the Priory of St Mary Magdalene thereafter, and it had a church by c.1150. In the early 13th century the priory was rebuilt with a larger church; in 1294 the population of the manor, including the monks, was around 200. The priory was dissolved in 1536 and parts of its buildings were incorporated into Monkton Farleigh Manor.

In the 19th century, quarrying for Bath stone became the main source of employment in the parish. The manor house and some land was bought in 1873 by Sir Charles Hobhouse, whose history of the parish was published in the Wiltshire Archaeological and Natural History Magazine in 1881. His son, also Charles, lived at the manor house until his death in 1941.

A National School was built in the 1870s, replacing earlier small schools, and by 1881 had an average attendance of 67. A new school with teacher's house was built in 1886. Children of all ages attended until 1930, when those over 11 transferred to the secondary school at Bradford on Avon. By 2005, numbers had fallen to 24 and the following year the school merged with the village school at Atworth, which continues on both sites as Churchfields School.

== Landmarks ==
The civil parish has 34 listed buildings, including:

- Monkton Farleigh Manor (Grade I)
- remains of the refectory at Monkton Farleigh Manor (Grade I ruin)
- Church of St. Peter (Grade II*)

Woodland at Inwood is a biological Site of Special Scientific Interest.

== Parish church ==
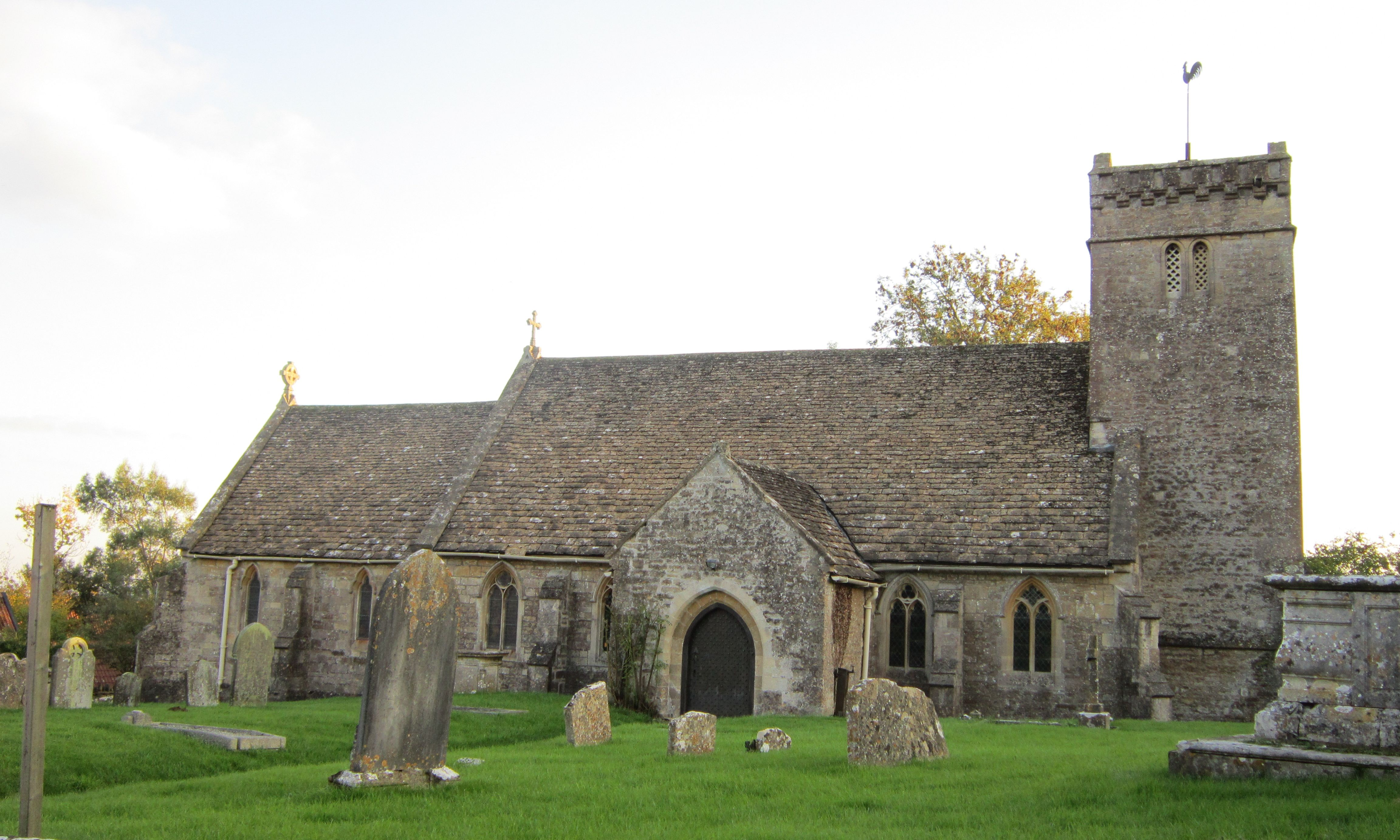
St Peter's Church

The parish church of St Peter was rebuilt by T.H. Wyatt in 1844, although the west tower may be from the 12th or 13th centuries. There was further restoration in 1874. A doorway in the north wall of the nave has an arch and shafts from the 12th century, with a 15th-century door inserted. A single-storey addition on the south side was built in 1829 as a Sunday school and is now used as a vestry.

The octagonal pulpit and the communion table are from the 17th century, and there is stained glass from the 1860s, 1870s and 1905. The three bells in the tower, from the 18th and 19th centuries, are said to be unringable. The church was recorded as Grade II* listed in 1962.

Today the church is part of the Benefice of North Bradford-on-Avon and Villages, alongside St James at South Wraxall, St Nicholas at Winsley and Christ Church at Bradford-on-Avon.

== CAD Monkton Farleigh ==
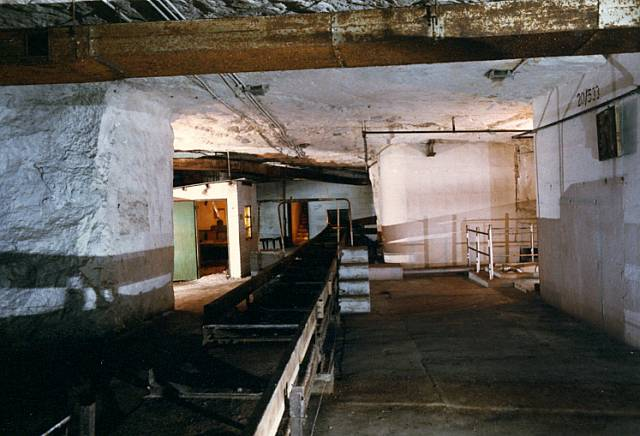
District 20 of the depot, showing the conveyor for moving munitions

In the 1930s, it was recognised that there was a need to provide secure storage for munitions across the United Kingdom. The proposal was to create three Central Ammunition Depots (CADs): one in the north (Longtown, Cumbria); one in the Midlands (Nesscliffe, Shropshire); and one in the south, namely CAD Monkton Farleigh, which was also known as CAD Corsham.

The easily hewn Bath stone, a form of limestone, had created a number of large, horizontal, and relatively dry quarries around Corsham. Monkton Farleigh quarry was renovated from the late 1930s by the Royal Engineers as one of the three major depots.

In November 1937 the Great Western Railway were contracted to build a 1,000 feet (300 m) long raised twin-loading platform at Shockerwick, between Box and Batheaston, with two sidings from the adjacent Bristol-London mainline branching off just outside the eastern entrance to the Box Tunnel at 51°24′19.31″N 2°17′22.94″W. 30 feet (9.1 m) below and at right angles to this point, the War Office had built a narrow gauge wagon sorting yard. This was attached by a 1.25 miles (2.01 km) tunnel built by The Cementation Company, descending at a rate of 1:8.5 to the Central Ammunition Depot, housed in the former mine workings. The whole logistics operation was designed to cope with a maximum of 1,000 tonnes (1,100 tons) of ammunition a day.

The narrow gauge trucks would descend from the platform to the tunnel, where a heavy-duty conveyor belt would carry the ammunition directly to the appropriate storage gallery. At any given time the depot was either taking in ammunition or sending it out, never both simultaneously. The construction design meant that an explosive accident or detonation inside any one of the stores would not propagate throughout the ammunition storehouse. The conveyor belt, and the original cable-way used as a temporary installation while the tunnel was being built, ran continuously for 30 days in the run-up to D-Day.

CAD Monkton Farleigh closed at the end of hostilities, although was kept in an operational condition until the 1950s. The sidings were then cleared, and not used again until the mid-1980s when a museum opened on the site; the museum had closed by 1990. Today the north end of the tunnel is sealed by a concrete and rubble installation, while the former mine/CAD is used for secure commercial document storage.

== Notable people ==
- George Herbert Moberly (1837–1895), Rector
- Charles Hobhouse (1862–1941), British Liberal politician
