= Thomas Baskerville (general) =

English general (died 1597)

Sir Thomas Baskerville (died 1597), was an English general and MP.

Baskerville was the son of Henry Baskerville, Esq., of the city of Hereford, and is described as of Good Rest, Warwickshire. He obtained a high reputation as a military commander. In The Harleian Miscellany, there is an account of his voyage after the great treasure at Puerto Rico, when he was general of Queen Elizabeth's Indian armada. He was sent with Lord Willoughby to France to assist Henry IV in 1589. He was Member of Parliament for Carmarthen borough in 1592. Subsequently, he commanded the troops despatched to Brittany (1594).

He then took part in an expedition to the Spanish Main in 1595 under the command of Francis Drake. After defeat at San Juan in December, Baskerville became second in command after the death of John Hawkins. In January 1596, an attempt to cross the isthmus of Panama from Nombre de Dios in order to seize the silver-rich port of Portobelo, Colón, also ended in failure. Ravaged with dysentery and other diseases, Baskerville bravely led his troops over 30 miles (48 km) before heading back. Drake would die of the former, and the expedition was forced to retreat back to England, all the while harassed by the Spanish.

He commanded the English army in Picardy, during the Siege of Amiens but died of a fever at Picquigny, on 4 June 1597. He was returned to England and was buried in the area of the new choir of Old St Paul's Cathedral. His grave and monument was destroyed in the Great Fire of London in 1666. He is listed on a modern monument in the crypt as one of the important graves lost in the fire.

Shortly before his death, he had purchased the manors of Sunningwell and Bayworth in Berkshire (now Oxfordshire), where his widow—Mary, daughter of Sir Thomas Throckmorton of Tortworth in Gloucestershire—lived and was buried. He left a son, Hannibal Baskerville.
