= Sunningwell =

Village in Oxfordshire, England

Coordinates: 51.701°N 1.283°W

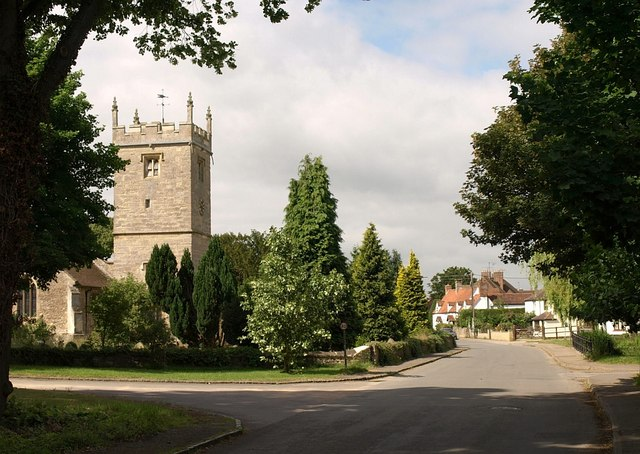
- Sunningwell Road with (left); St Leonard's parish church

- Location within Oxfordshire
- Population: 904 (2011 Census)
- OS grid reference: SP4900
- Civil parish: Sunningwell
- District: Vale of White Horse
- Shire county: Oxfordshire
- Region: South East
- Country: England
- Sovereign state: United Kingdom
- Post town: Abingdon
- Postcode district: OX13
- Dialling code: 01865
- Police: Thames Valley
- Fire: Oxfordshire
- Ambulance: South Central
- UK Parliament: Oxford West and Abingdon
- Website: Sunningwell Parish Council

Sunningwell is a village and civil parish about 3 1/2 miles (6 km) south of Oxford, England. The parish includes the village of Bayworth and the eastern part of Boars Hill. The parish was part of Berkshire until the 1974 boundary changes transferred it to Oxfordshire. The 2011 Census recorded the parish population as 904.

== Toponym ==
In 9th-century Saxon charters Sunningwell's place-name is spelt Sunnigwellan and Sunningauuille. The Domesday Book of 1086 records it as Soningeuell. The name is derived from Old English, meaning "the spring of Sunna's people".

== Manor ==
The Domesday Book records that Abingdon Abbey held the manors of Sunningwell and Bayworth by 1086, and it assessed Sunningwell manor at five hides. The abbey retained both manors until 1538, when it surrendered all its properties to the Crown in the Dissolution of the Monasteries. In 1545 the manors of Sunningwell and Bayworth were granted to Robert Browne (a goldsmith), Christopher Edmondes and William Wenlowe. They seem to have been speculators who bought them for a quick profit, as they alienated the manors in 1546. The buyer was John Williams, later Baron Williams of Thame. Baron Williams died in 1559 without a male heir, and the manors passed to his elder daughter Margery and her husband Henry Norris, 1st Baron Norreys. In 1583 Margery sold Sunningwell and Bayworth to her younger sister Isabel and her second husband Richard Huddleston. By 1589 Richard and Isabel were dead and had left the two manors mortgaged to a Richard Martin.

In 1597 Martin sold the manors to the Elizabethan general Sir Thomas Baskerville, but he died on a campaign in Picardy that year so he probably never lived there. The two manors passed to Sir Thomas's son Hannibal Baskerville (1597–1668), grandson Thomas Baskerville and great-grandson Matthew Baskerville, all of whom lived at Bayworth. Matthew Baskerville died in 1720–21 with no legitimate heir, but during his lifetime he had sold Sunningwell and Bayworth in return for an annuity of £80 to Sir John Stonehouse, lord of the manor of Radley. Sunningwell and Bayworth remained with the Stonehouse family and their successors the Bowyers until about 1884, when an Edgar John Disney of Ingatestone in Essex foreclosed a mortgage on the manor. He retained the manor for the rest of his life, but his son Edgar Norton Disney sold most of it in 1912.

== Parish church ==
The oldest known record of the Church of England parish church of St Leonard is from 1246. The nave and parts of the chancel date from this time, and there is one blocked 13th-century window in the south wall of the nave. The east end of the chancel was rebuilt late in the 13th or early in the 14th century with a Decorated Gothic east window. Late in the 15th century the Perpendicular Gothic south transept and north tower were built and the nave was given Perpendicular Gothic windows and an embattled parapet. The Elizabethan polygonal west porch with Ionic columns is said to have been given by John Jewel, Bishop of Salisbury, who had been rector of Sunningwell St Leonard's in about 1551.

Samuel Fell was rector of St Leonard's from 1625 to 1649. The west tower has a ring of six bells. Henry II Knight of Reading cast the tenor in the Commonwealth era in 1653. Charles and George Mears of the Whitechapel Bell Foundry cast the second, third, fourth and fifth bells in 1857. Mears and Stainbank, also of the Whitechapel foundry, cast the treble bell in 1933. In 1877 St Leonard's was restored under the direction of JP Seddon, a friend of William Morris, who designed the stained glass in the east window. The church is a Grade II* listed building.

== Notable people ==
The painter J. M. W. Turner stayed with his uncle and aunt in the village aged 14 and sketched in the area.

== Amenities ==
In the 19th century a cottage opposite St Leonard's parish church was made the home for a schoolteacher, and a schoolroom was built next to it. In the 20th century it became Sunningwell Church of England Primary School and moved to new premises in Dark Lane at the west end of the village. The 19th-century school building is now Sunningwell School of Art. Sunningwell has a public house, the Flowing Well.

== Sources ==
- Ditchfield, PH; Page, William, eds. (1924). A History of the County of Berkshire. Victoria County History. Vol. IV. assisted by John Hautenville Cope. London: The St Katherine Press. pp. 423–427.
- Ekwall, Eilert (1960) [1936]. Concise Oxford Dictionary of English Place-Names (4th ed.). Oxford: Oxford University Press. ISBN 0198691033.
- Pevsner, Nikolaus (1966). Berkshire. The Buildings of England. Harmondsworth: Penguin Books. pp. 234–235.
