= Monkton Farleigh Priory =

Former priory in the United Kingdom

Coordinates: 51.3890°N 2.2798°W

The Priory of St Mary Magdalene was a Cluniac priory in Monkton Farleigh, Wiltshire, England, in the 12th to 16th centuries.

The priory was founded soon after 1120 by Maud (Matilda) of Salisbury, daughter of Edward of Salisbury and widow of Humphrey de Bohun, and her son Humphrey II de Bohun. A priory church was probably completed c.1150 and the priory came to benefit from several manors, estates and churches. The priory was rebuilt in the early 13th century, with a larger church. On its dissolution in 1536 there were six monks. The Wiltshire Victoria County History has a detailed account of the priory and its properties.

The remains of the priory were incorporated into Monkton Farleigh Manor. Monk's Well conduit house still stands, 280 metres west of the manor house; it has probably supplied water to the priory and manor house since the early 12th century and is a scheduled monument.
