= Cluniac priories in Great Britain =

List of cluniac order religious houses

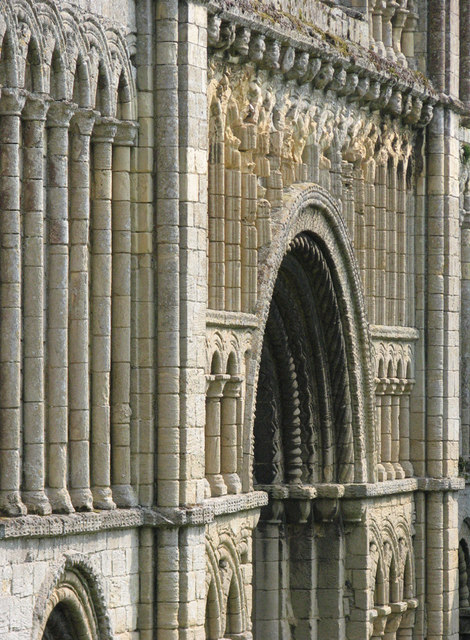
Castle Acre Priory, Norfolk. Cluniac churches were more ornate than their counterparts in other orders.

In the Middle Ages, from the 11th century, the Cluniac order established a number of religious houses in England, Wales, and Scotland.

== History ==
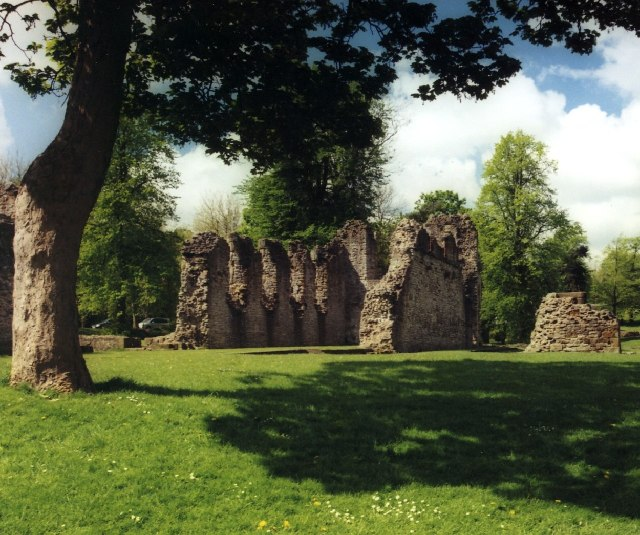
Dudley Priory, founded in the 11th century in Dudley, West Midlands

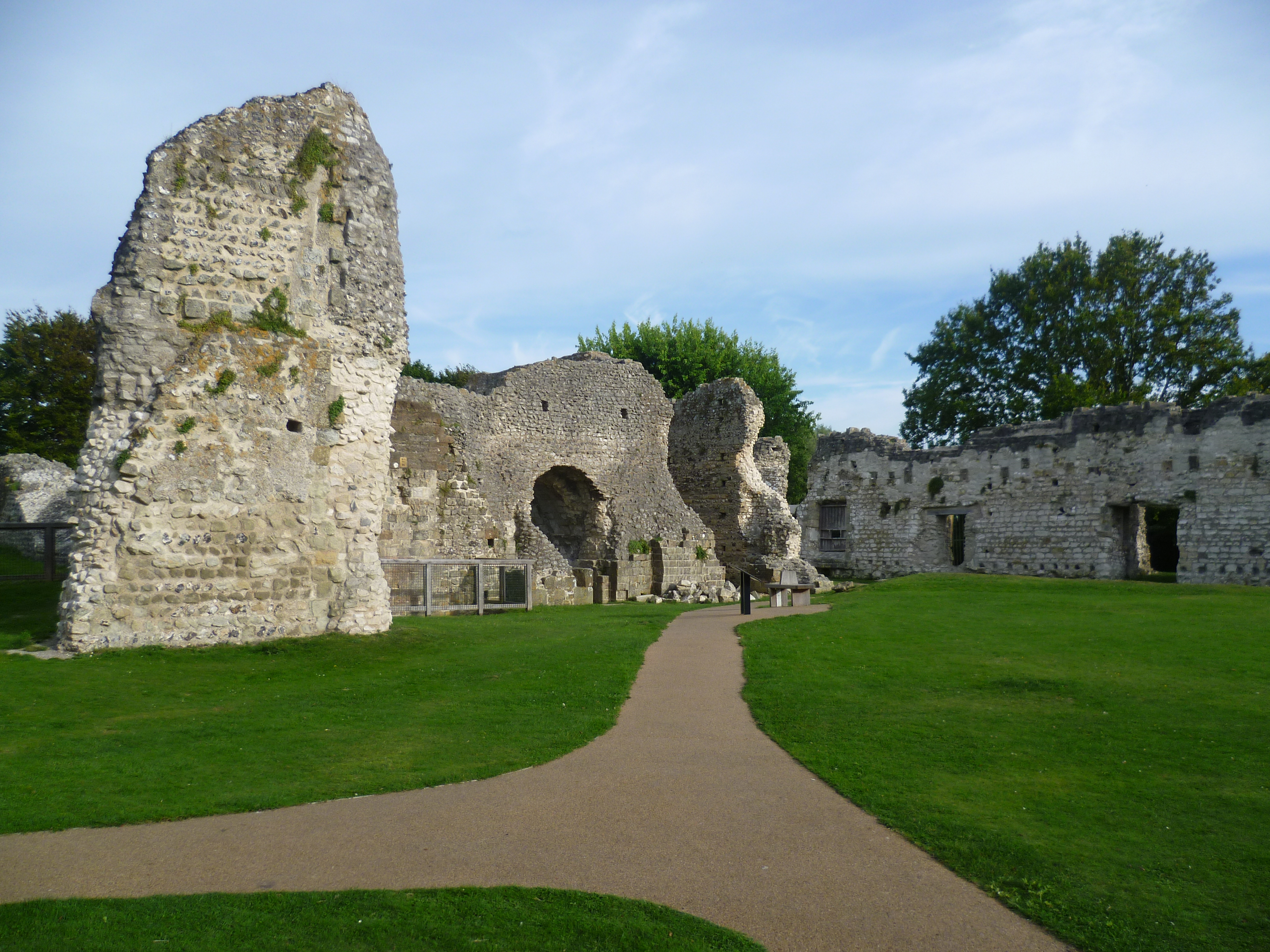
Lewes Priory, Sussex, the first Cluniac house in Britain.

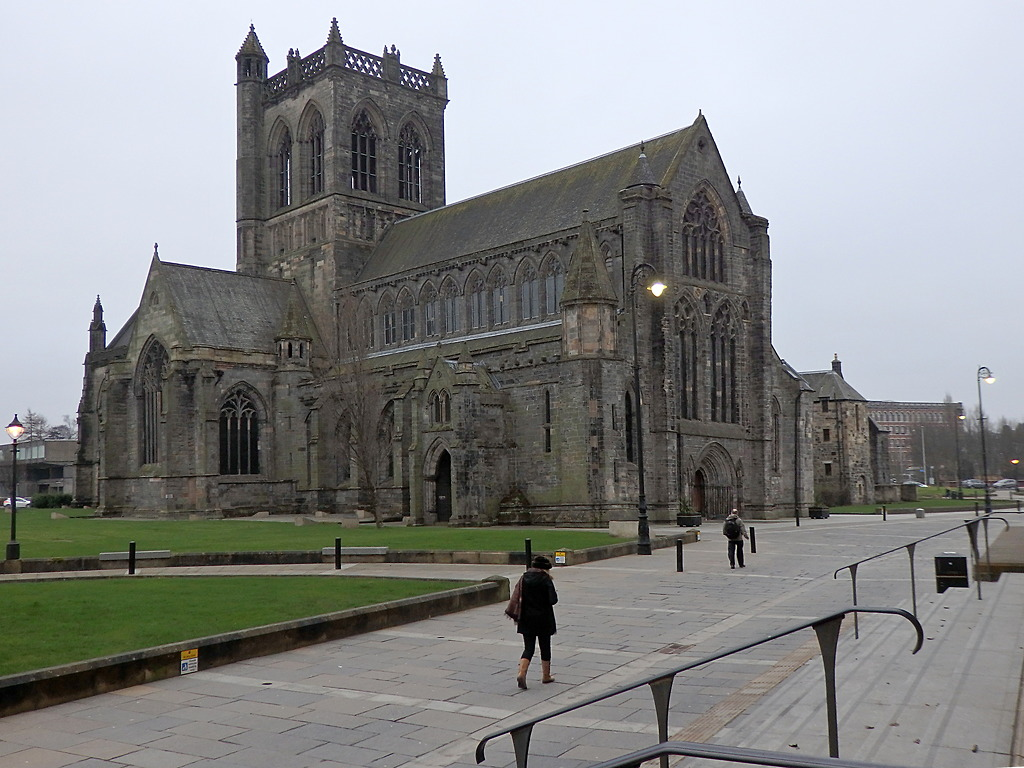
Paisley Abbey, Renfrewshire

Traditionally the Rule of Saint Benedict was interpreted as meaning that each monastery should be independent of other houses, but this made it problematic to achieve reform if discipline had slipped or to resist the pressure to become a part of the feudal structure, with the office of Abbot becoming an office at the disposal of the local lord. The Cluniac reform, the first major attempt to offer an institutional response to these issues, was to subvert this by making all of the monks of the houses that were part of Cluny members of the Cluny Abbey, with the subordinate houses being Priories of the Abbey. Subsequent orders – such as the Carthusians – were wholly integrated as an order, and modern Benedictines are organised in families which offer mutual accountability, e.g. the English Benedictine Congregation and the Subiaco Cassinese Congregation.

Those houses that were larger than cells were known as priories, symbolising their subordination to the Abbey of Cluny in Burgundy. The prior of St Pancras at Lewes usually held the position of vicar-general of the Abbot of Cluny for England and Scotland. Since the head of their order was the Abbot at Cluny, all members of the order in Britain were bound to cross to France to visit Cluny to consult or be consulted, unless the Abbot chose to come to Britain. This he did five times in the 13th century, and only twice in the 14th.

In 1056, the first Cluniac nunnery was founded at Marcigny and after this other convents followed including those in the British Isles. The Cluniac nuns were always greatly outnumbered by their male counterparts.

In England, the Cluniac houses numbered thirty-five at the time of Henry VIII's dissolution of the monasteries in the 16th century. At that time there were also two houses in the kingdom of Scotland, including Paisley which was elevated to the rank of abbey in 1245.

In 1281, the priory of Monk Bretton in Yorkshire ceased to be a Cluniac house, and remained Benedictine until the Dissolution.

== List of houses ==
=== England ===
- Arthington Priory, Yorkshire (nuns)
- Barnstaple Priory, Devon
- Bermondsey Abbey, London
- Bromholm Priory, Norfolk
- Castle Acre Priory, Norfolk
- Daventry Priory, Northamptonshire
- Delapré Abbey, Northampton (nuns)
- Derby Cluniac Priory, Derby
- Dudley Priory, Dudley, West Midlands
- Faversham Abbey, Kent – autonomous Cluniac Abbey
- Glastonbury Abbey, Somerset – autonomous Cluniac Abbey between 1120 and 1170 under Abbot Henry of Blois, Bishop of Winchester
- Kerswell Priory, Devon
- Lenton Priory, Nottingham
- St Mary's Priory, Mendham, Suffolk
- Monk Bretton Priory, Yorkshire (until 1281)
- Monkton Farleigh Priory, Wiltshire
- Montacute Priory, Somerset
- Pontefract Priory, Yorkshire
- Prittlewell Priory, Essex
- Reading Abbey, Berkshire – autonomous Cluniac Abbey
- St Andrew's Priory, Northampton
- St Mawgan Monastery, Cornwall
- St Pancras Priory, Lewes, Sussex
- Stansgate Priory, Essex
- Tenbury Priory, Worcestershire
- Thetford Priory, Norfolk
- Tickford Priory, Buckinghamshire
- Wangford Priory, Suffolk
- Wenlock Priory, Shropshire

=== Scotland ===
- Crossraguel Abbey, Ayrshire
- Paisley Abbey, Renfrewshire
- Renfrew Abbey, Renfrewshire (moved to Paisley in 1169)

=== Wales ===
- Malpas Priory
- St Clears Priory
