= Chrysanthemum =

- Chrysanthemum indicum

Scientific classification
- Kingdom: Plantae
- Clade: Tracheophytes
- Clade: Angiosperms
- Clade: Eudicots
- Clade: Asterids
- Order: Asterales
- Family: Asteraceae
- Subfamily: Asteroideae
- Tribe: Anthemideae
- Genus: Chrysanthemum; L.

Type species
- Chrysanthemum indicum L.

Synonyms
- Chrysanthemum subsect. Dendranthema (DC.) DC. ex Kitam.; Neuractis Cass.; Pyrethrum sect. Dendranthema DC.; Leucanthemum (Tourn.) L.; Dendranthema (DC.) Des Moul.

Genus of flowering plants in the daisy family

Chrysanthemum
- The Chinese character for "chrysanthemum"

Chinese name
- Chinese: 菊花
- Literal meaning: "chrysanthemum-flower"
Transcriptions
Standard Mandarin
- Hanyu Pinyin: júhuā
- Bopomofo: ㄐㄩˊ ㄏㄨㄚ
- Wade–Giles: chü^{2}-hua^{1}
- IPA: [tɕy̌.xwá]
Wu
- Wugniu: cioq^{7} ho^{1}; ciuq^{7} ho^{1}; ciuq^{7} hua^{1} (Hangzhounese); ciuq^{7} huo^{1} (Ningbonese); cioq^{7} hua^{1} (Jinhuanese)
- IPA: Shanghainese: [tɕyɪʔ˧ ho˦] Suzhounese: [tɕyəʔ˦ ho˨˧] Chongmingese: [tɕyoʔ˥ ho˥] Hangzhounese: [tɕyəʔ˧ hua˧˦] Ningbonese: [tɕyəʔ˥ huo˧] Jinhuanese: [tɕioʔ˦ huɑ˥]
Hakka
- Romanization: kiug faˋ
Yue: Cantonese
- Yale Romanization: gūkfāa
- Jyutping: guk^{1} faa^{1}
- IPA: [kʊk̚˥.fa˥]
Southern Min
- Hokkien POJ: kak-hue (col.) kiok-hue (lit.)

Korean name
- Hangul: 국화
- Hanja: 菊花
Transcriptions
- Revised Romanization: Gukhwa
- McCune–Reischauer: Kukhwa

Japanese name
- Kanji: 菊花
- Hiragana: きくか きっか
Transcriptions
- Romanization: kiku ka kikka

Chrysanthemums (/krɪˈsænθəməmz/ kriss-AN-thə-məmz), sometimes abbreviated to mums or chrysanths, are perennial herbaceous flowering plants in the family Asteraceae that bloom in the autumn. They are native to East Asia and northeastern Europe. Most species originate from East Asia, and the center of diversity is in China. Many thousands of horticultural varieties and cultivars exist.

A late-season flower, Chrysanthemums are associated in the Northern Hemisphere with the month of November.

== Description ==
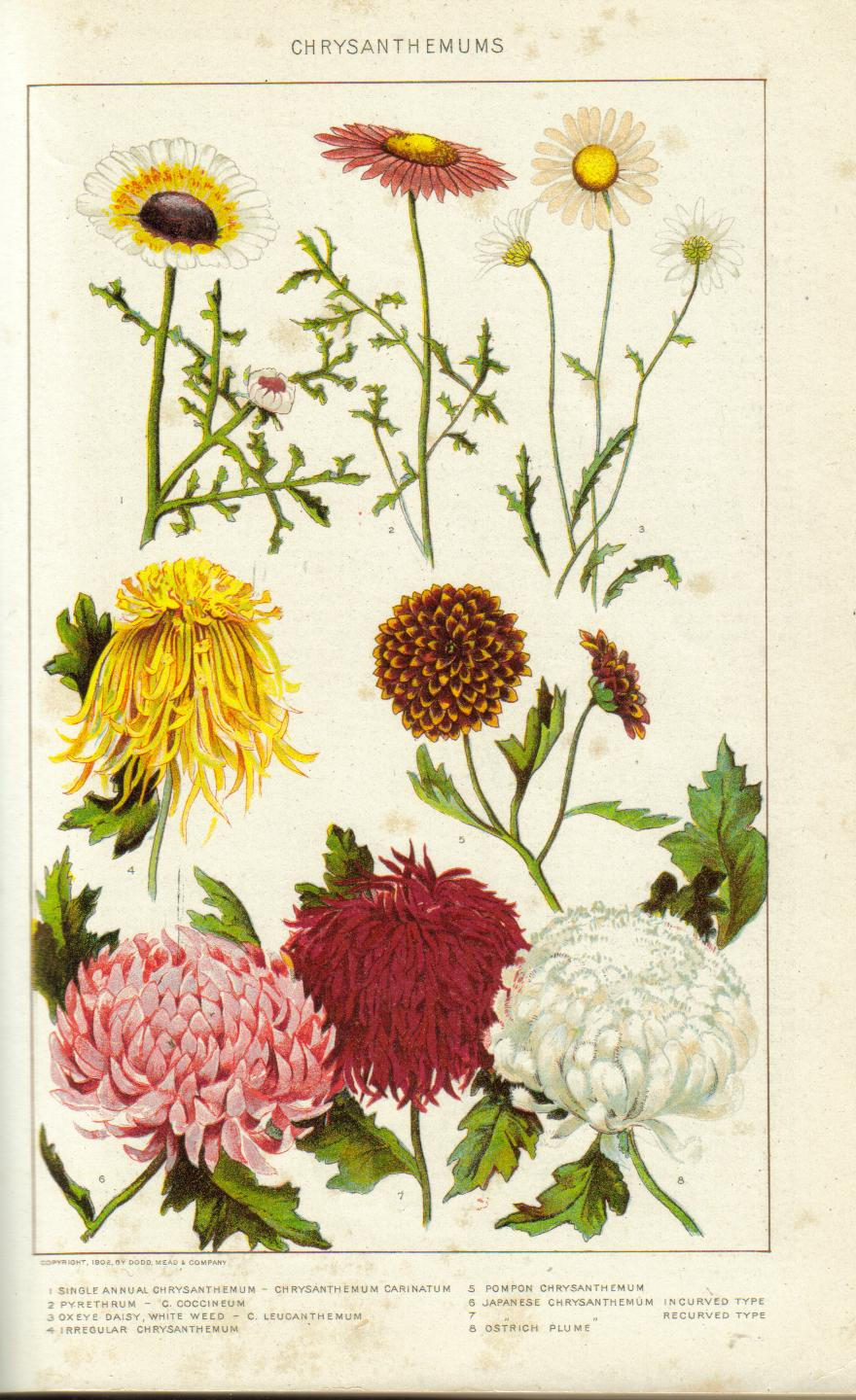
Historical painting of chrysanthemums from the New International Encyclopedia, 1902

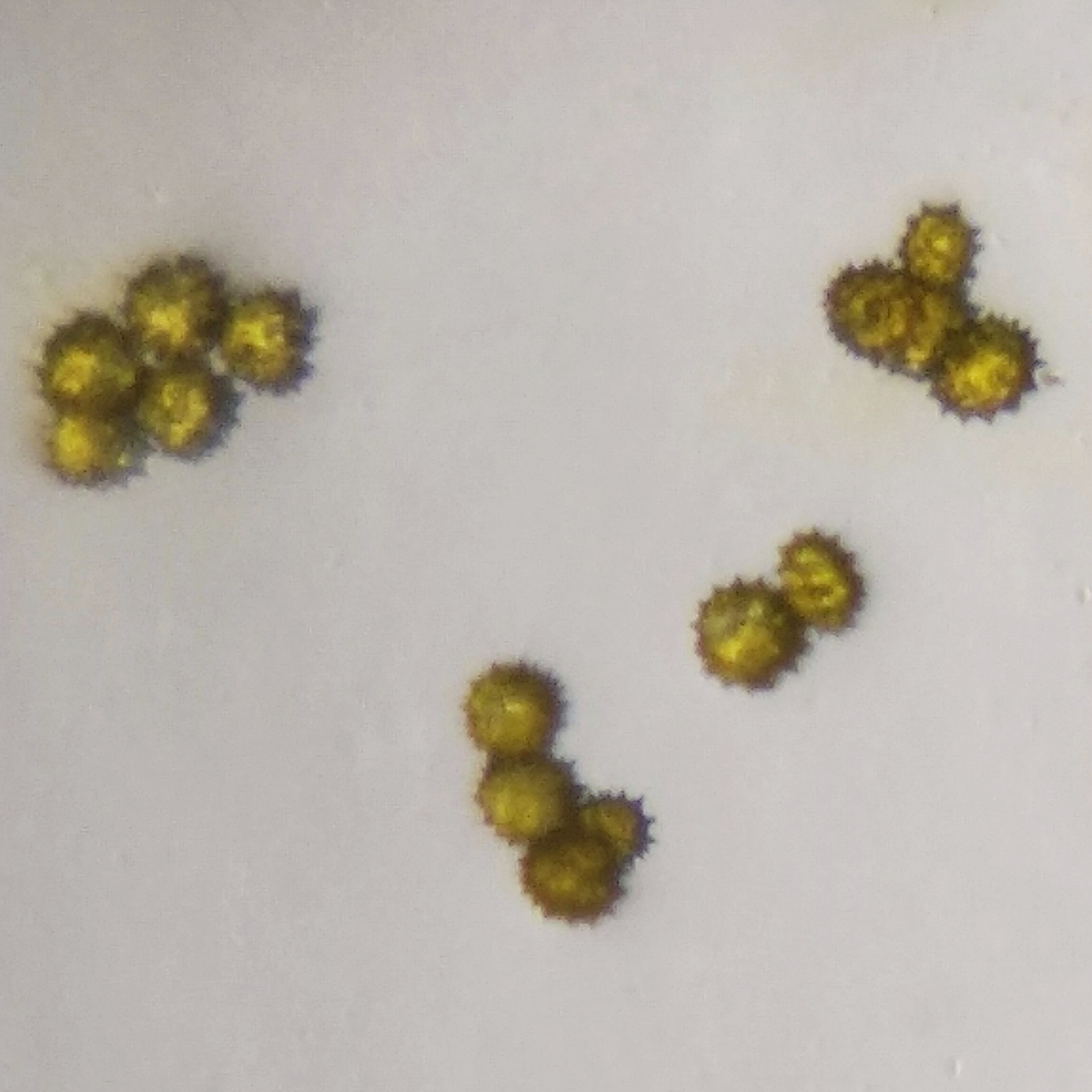
Pollen

The genus Chrysanthemum consists of perennial herbaceous flowering plants, sometimes subshrubs. The leaves are alternate, divided into leaflets and may be pinnatisect, lobed, or serrate (toothed) but rarely entire; they are connected to stalks with hairy bases.

The compound inflorescence is an array of several flower heads, or sometimes a solitary head. The head has a base covered in layers of phyllaries. The simple row of ray florets is white, yellow, or red. The disc florets are yellow. Pollen grains are approximately 34 microns.

The fruit is a ribbed achene.

== Etymology ==
The name "chrysanthemum" is derived from the Ancient Greek: χρυσός chrysos (gold) and ἄνθεμον anthemon (flower).

== Taxonomy ==
The genus Chrysanthemum was first formally described by Linnaeus in 1753, with 14 species, and hence bears his name (L.) as the botanical authority. The genus once included more species, but was split several decades ago into several genera, putting the economically important florist's chrysanthemums in the genus Dendranthema. The naming of these genera has been contentious, but a ruling of the International Botanical Congress in 1999 changed the defining species of the genus to Chrysanthemum indicum, restoring the florist's chrysanthemums to the genus Chrysanthemum.

Genera now separated from Chrysanthemum include Argyranthemum, Glebionis, Leucanthemopsis, Leucanthemum, Rhodanthemum, and Tanacetum.

=== Species ===
As of September 2025, Plants of the World Online accepted the following species:

- Chrysanthemum × aphrodite Kitam.
- Chrysanthemum arcticum L.
- Chrysanthemum argyrophyllum Ling
- Chrysanthemum arisanense Hayata
- Chrysanthemum bizarre C.Z.Shen
- Chrysanthemum chalchingolicum Grubov
- Chrysanthemum chanetii H.Lév.
- Chrysanthemum crassum (Kitam.) Kitam.
- Chrysanthemum × cuneifolium Kitam.
- Chrysanthemum dabieshanense Z.X.Fu, A.G.Zhen & Y.P.Ma
- Chrysanthemum dichrum (C.Shih) H.Ohashi & Yonek.
- Chrysanthemum foliaceum (G.F.Peng, C.Shih & S.Q.Zhang) J.M.Wang & Y.T.Hou
- Chrysanthemum glabriusculum (W.W.Sm.) Hand.-Mazz.
- Chrysanthemum horaimontanum Masam.
- Chrysanthemum hypargyreum Diels
- Chrysanthemum indicum L.
- Chrysanthemum integrifolium Richardson
- Chrysanthemum japonense (Makino) Nakai
- Chrysanthemum lavandulifolium Makino
- Chrysanthemum × leucanthum (Makino) Makino
- Chrysanthemum longibracteatum (C.Shih, G.F.Peng & S.Y.Jin) J.M.Wang & Y.T.Hou
- Chrysanthemum makinoi Matsum. & Nakai
- Chrysanthemum maximoviczii Kom.
- Chrysanthemum × miyatojimense Kitam.
- Chrysanthemum × morifolium (Ramat.) Hemsl.
- Chrysanthemum morii Hayata
- Chrysanthemum naktongense Nakai
- Chrysanthemum nankingense Hand.-Mazz.
- Chrysanthemum neo-oreastrum C.C.Chang
- Chrysanthemum ogawae Kitam.
- Chrysanthemum okiense Kitam.
- Chrysanthemum oreastrum Hance
- Chrysanthemum ornatum Hemsl.
- Chrysanthemum parvifolium C.C.Chang
- Chrysanthemum potentilloides Hand.-Mazz.
- Chrysanthemum rhombifolium (Y.Ling & C.Shih) H.Ohashi & Yonek.
- Chrysanthemum × shimotomaii Makino
- Chrysanthemum sinuatum Ledeb.
- Chrysanthemum vestitum (Hemsl.) Kitam.
- Chrysanthemum yantaiense M.Sun & J.T.Chen
- Chrysanthemum yoshinaganthum Makino
- Chrysanthemum zawadzkii Herbich
- Chrysanthemum zhuozishanense L.Q.Zhao & Jie Yang

Former species include:

- Chrysanthemum carinatum = Ismelia carinata
- Chrysanthemum cinerariifolium = Tanacetum cinerariifolium
- Chrysanthemum coccineum = Tanacetum coccineum
- Chrysanthemum coronarium = Glebionis coronaria
- Chrysanthemum frutescens = Argyranthemum frutescens
- Chrysanthemum maximum = Leucanthemum maximum
- Chrysanthemum pacificum = Ajania pacifica
- Chrysanthemum segetum = Glebionis segetum

== Cultivation ==
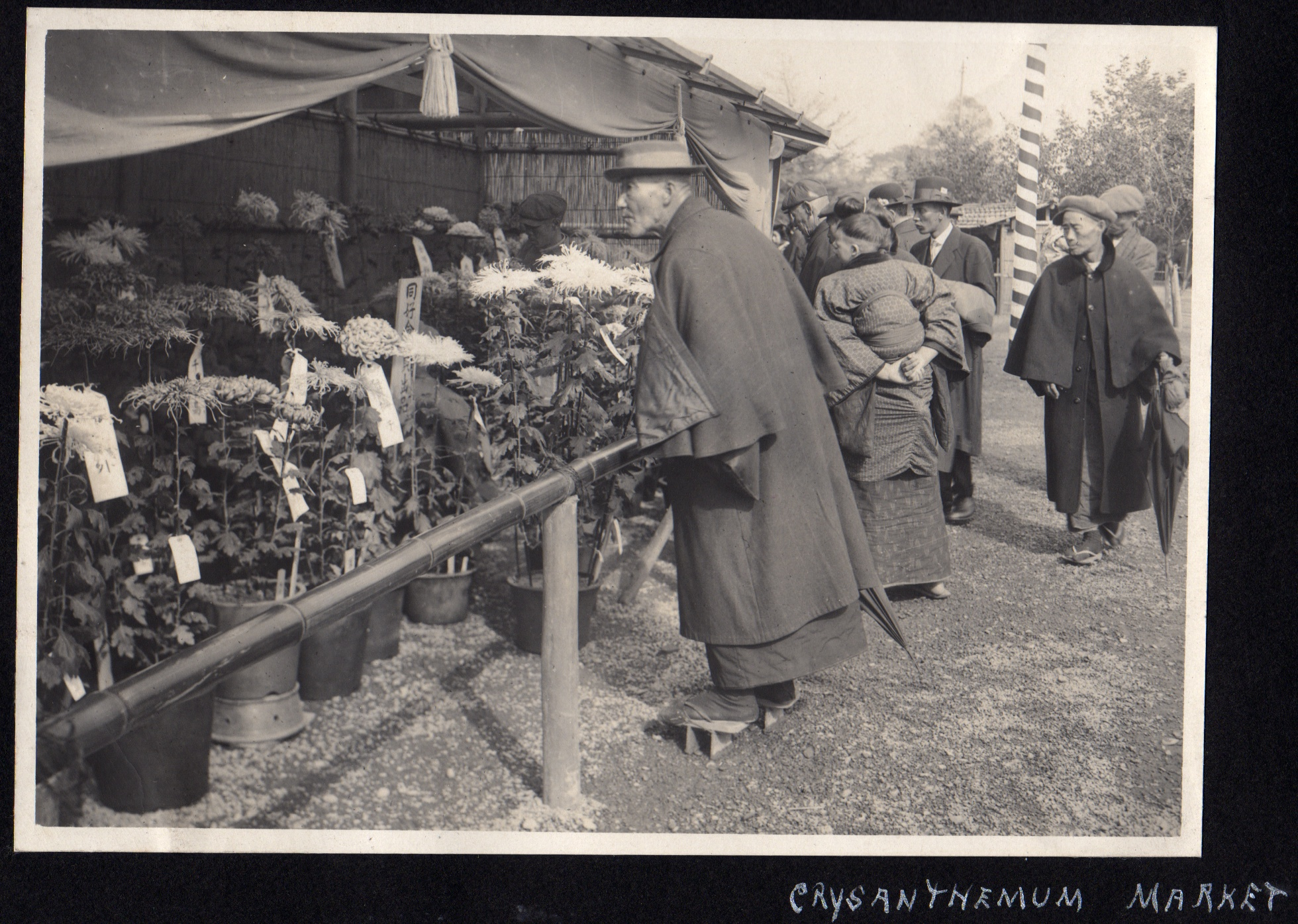
A chrysanthemum market in Japan, 1914

Chrysanthemums (Chinese: 菊花; pinyin: Júhuā) were first cultivated in China as a flowering herb as far back as the 15th century BCE. Over 500 cultivars had been recorded by 1630. By 2014, it was estimated that there were over 20,000 cultivars in the world and about 7,000 cultivars in China. The plant is renowned as one of the Four Gentlemen (四君子) in Chinese and East Asian Art. The plant is particularly significant during the Double Ninth Festival.

Chrysanthemum cultivation in Japan began during the Nara and Heian periods (early 8th to late 12th centuries) and gained popularity in the Edo period (early 17th to late 19th century). Many flower shapes, colours, and varieties were created. The way the flowers were grown and shaped also developed, and chrysanthemum culture flourished. Various cultivars of chrysanthemums created in the Edo period were characterized by a remarkable variety of flower shapes. They were exported to China from the end of the Edo period, changing the way Chinese chrysanthemum cultivars were grown and their popularity. In addition, from the Meiji period (late 19th to early 20th century), many cultivars with flowers over 20 centimetres (7 7/8 in) in diameter, called the Ogiku (lit., great chrysanthemum) style, were created, which influenced the subsequent trend of chrysanthemums. The imperial crest of Japan is a chrysanthemum, and the institution of the monarchy is also called the Chrysanthemum Throne. A number of festivals and shows take place throughout Japan in autumn when the flowers bloom. Chrysanthemum Day (菊の節句, Kiku no Sekku) is one of the five ancient sacred festivals. It is celebrated on the 9th day of the 9th month. It was started in 910, when the imperial court held its first chrysanthemum show.

Chrysanthemums entered American horticulture in 1798 when Colonel John Stevens imported a cultivated variety known as Dark Purple from England. The introduction was part of an effort to grow attractions within Elysian Fields in Hoboken, New Jersey.

=== Classification ===
For horticultural purposes, all Chrysanthemum cultivars are split into 13 divisions based upon flower form, a classification developed by the National Chrysanthemum Society (USA).

== Uses ==
=== Ornamental uses ===
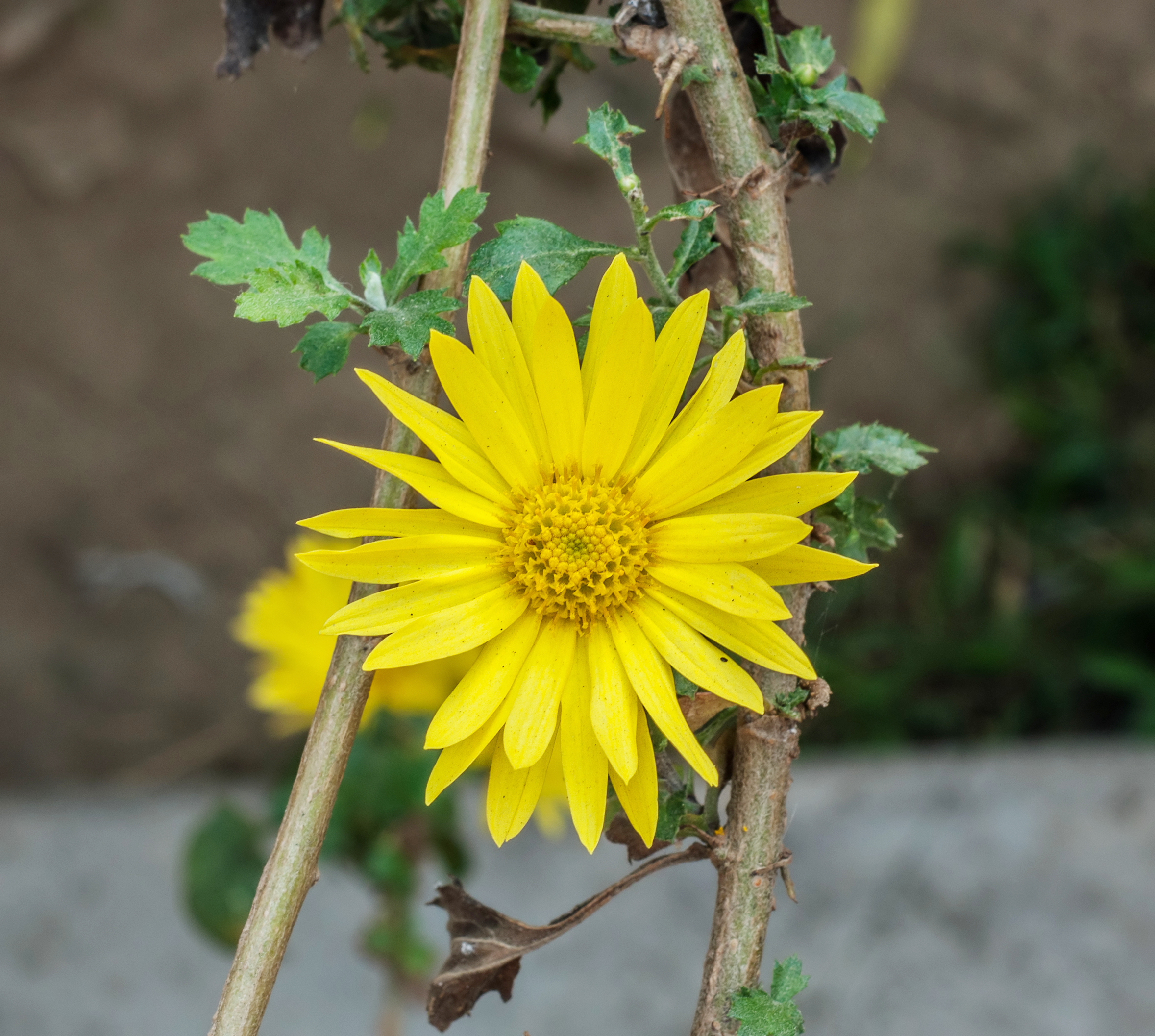
C. indicum

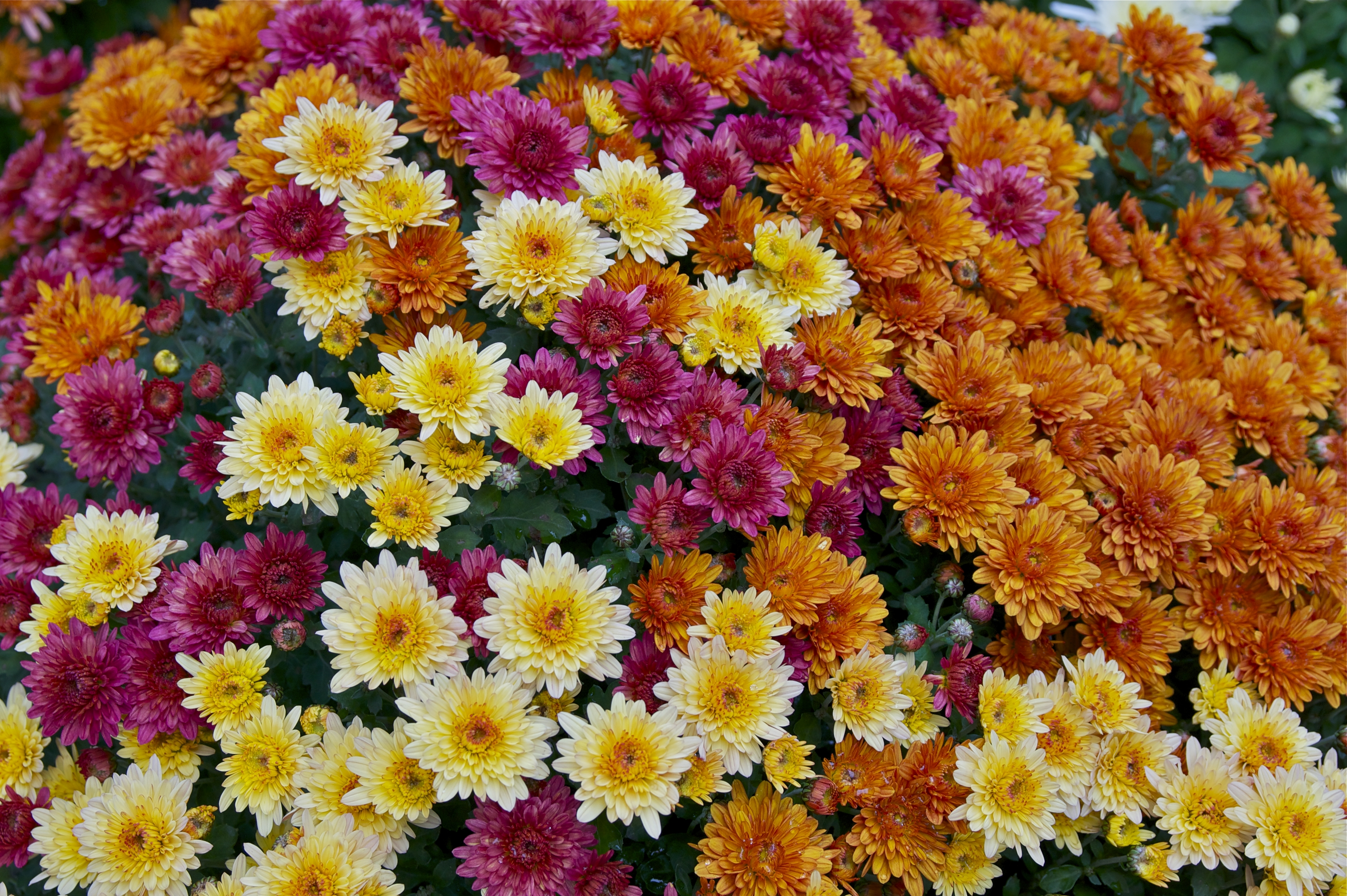
Different colors of Chrysanthemum x morifolium

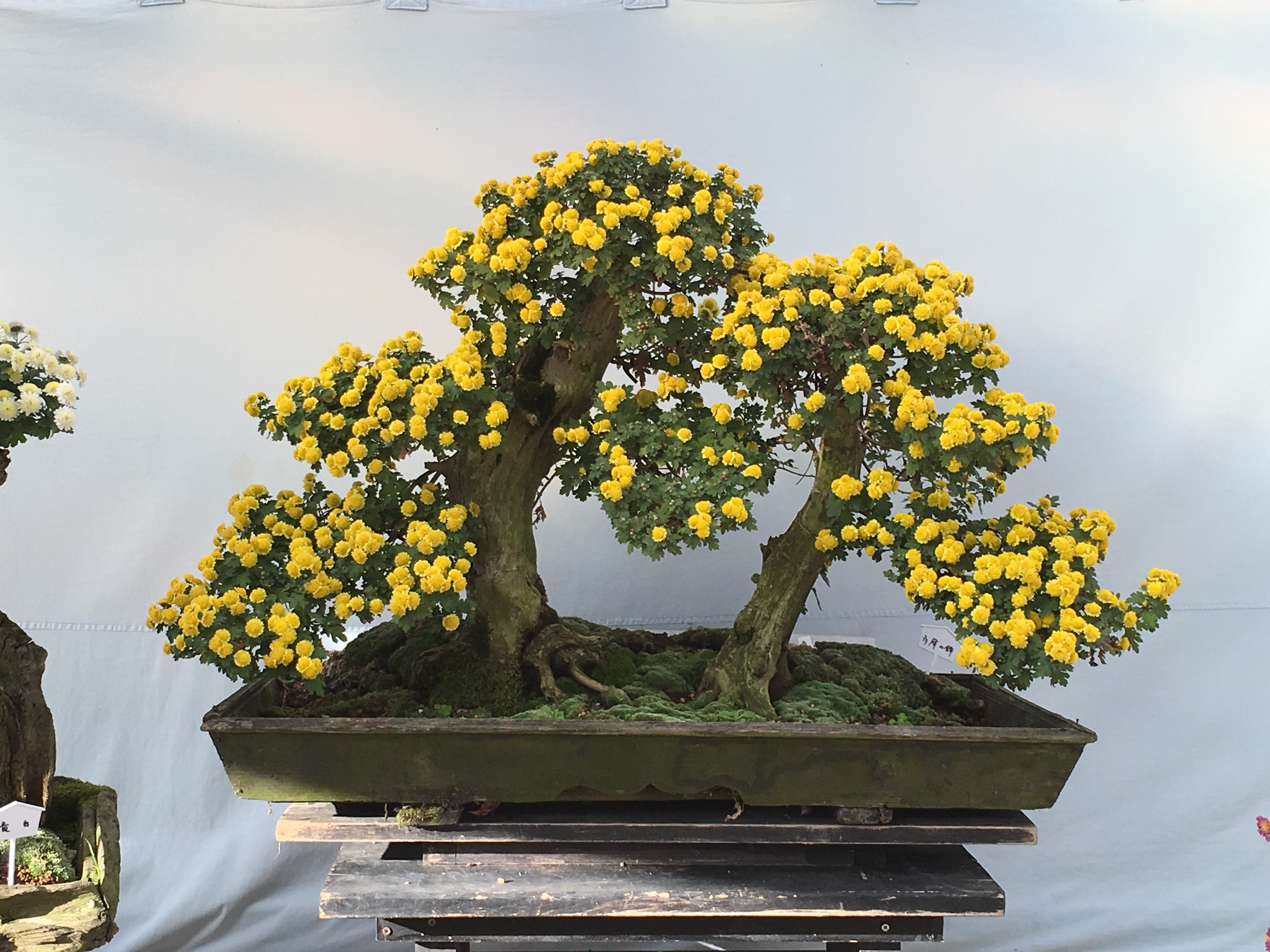
Example of a Japanese chrysanthemum bonsai

Modern cultivated chrysanthemums are usually brighter and more striking than their wild relatives. Many horticultural specimens have been bred to bear many rows of ray florets in a great variety of colors. The flower heads occur in various forms, and can be daisy-like or decorative, like pompons or buttons. This genus contains many hybrids and thousands of cultivars developed for horticultural purposes. In addition to the traditional yellow, other colors are available, such as white, purple, and red. The most important hybrid is Chrysanthemum × morifolium (syn. C. × grandiflorum), derived primarily from C. indicum, but also involving other species.

Over 140 cultivars of chrysanthemum have gained the Royal Horticultural Society's Award of Garden Merit (confirmed 2017).

In Japan, a form of chrysanthemum bonsai was developed over the centuries. The cultivated flower has a lifespan of about 5 years and can be kept in miniature size. A bonsai-like effect can also be created by using pieces of dead wood with the flower growing over the back along the wood, to give the illusion from the front that the a miniature tree blooms in chrysanthemums.

=== Culinary uses ===
Yellow or white chrysanthemum flowers of the species C. morifolium are boiled to make a tea in some parts of East Asia. The resulting beverage is known simply as chrysanthemum tea (菊花茶, pinyin: júhuā chá, in Chinese). In Korea, a rice wine flavored with chrysanthemum flowers is called gukhwaju (국화주).

Chrysanthemum leaves are steamed or boiled and used as greens, especially in Chinese cuisine. The flowers may be added to dishes such as mixian in broth or thick snakemeat soup (蛇羹) to enhance the aroma. They are commonly used in hot pot and stir fries. In Japanese cuisine, small chrysanthemums are used as garnish for sashimi.

=== Insecticidal uses ===
Pyrethrum (Chrysanthemum cinerariaefolium or Tanacetum cinerariaefolium) is economically important as a natural source of insecticide. The flowers are pulverized, and the active components, called pyrethrins, which occur in the achenes, are extracted and sold in the form of an oleoresin. This is applied as a suspension in water or oil, or as a powder. Pyrethrins attack the nervous systems of all insects, and inhibit female mosquitoes from biting. In sublethal doses, they have an insect repellent effect. They are harmful to fish, but are far less toxic to mammals and birds than many synthetic insecticides. They are not persistent, being biodegradable, and also decompose easily on exposure to light. Pyrethroids such as permethrin are synthetic insecticides based on natural pyrethrum. Despite this, chrysanthemum leaves are still a major host for destructive pests, such as leafminer flies including L. trifolii.

Persian powder is an example of industrial product of chrysanthemum insecticide.

=== Environmental uses ===
Chrysanthemum plants have been shown to reduce indoor air pollution by the NASA Clean Air Study.

== In culture ==
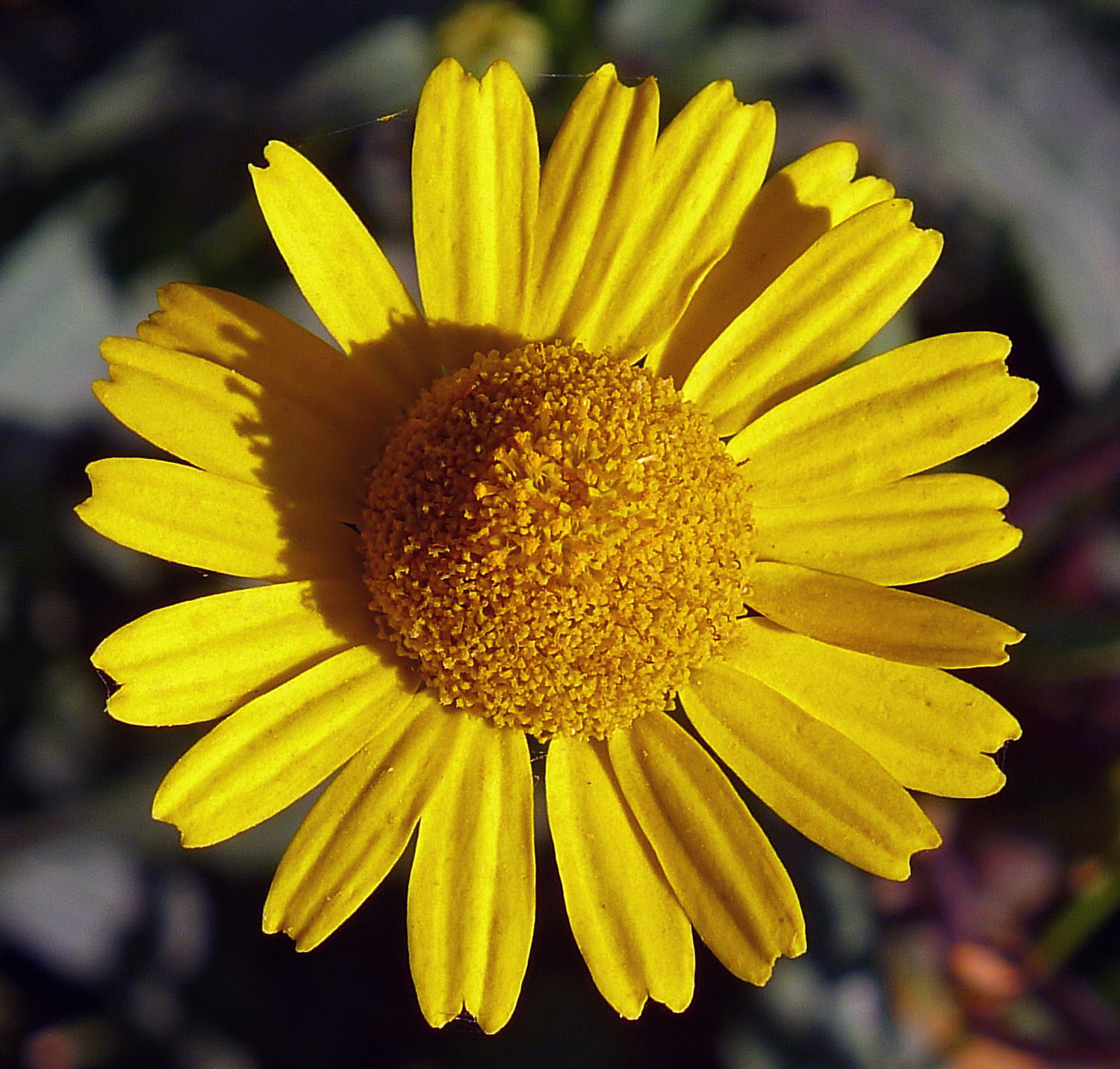
Coleostephus myconis (chrysanthemum of Myconos) of the garden of plants in Paris.

In some European countries (e.g., France, Belgium, Italy, Spain, Poland, Hungary, Croatia), incurve chrysanthemums symbolize death and are used only for funerals or on graves, while other types carry no such symbolism; similarly, in China, Japan, and Korea of East Asia, white chrysanthemums symbolize adversity, lamentation, and/or grief. In some other countries, they represent honesty. In the United States, the flower is usually regarded as positive and cheerful, with New Orleans as a notable exception.

In the Victorian language of flowers, the chrysanthemum had several meanings. The Chinese chrysanthemum meant cheerfulness, whereas the red chrysanthemum stood for "I Love", while the yellow chrysanthemum symbolized slighted love. The chrysanthemum is also the flower of November.

=== East Asia ===
==== China ====
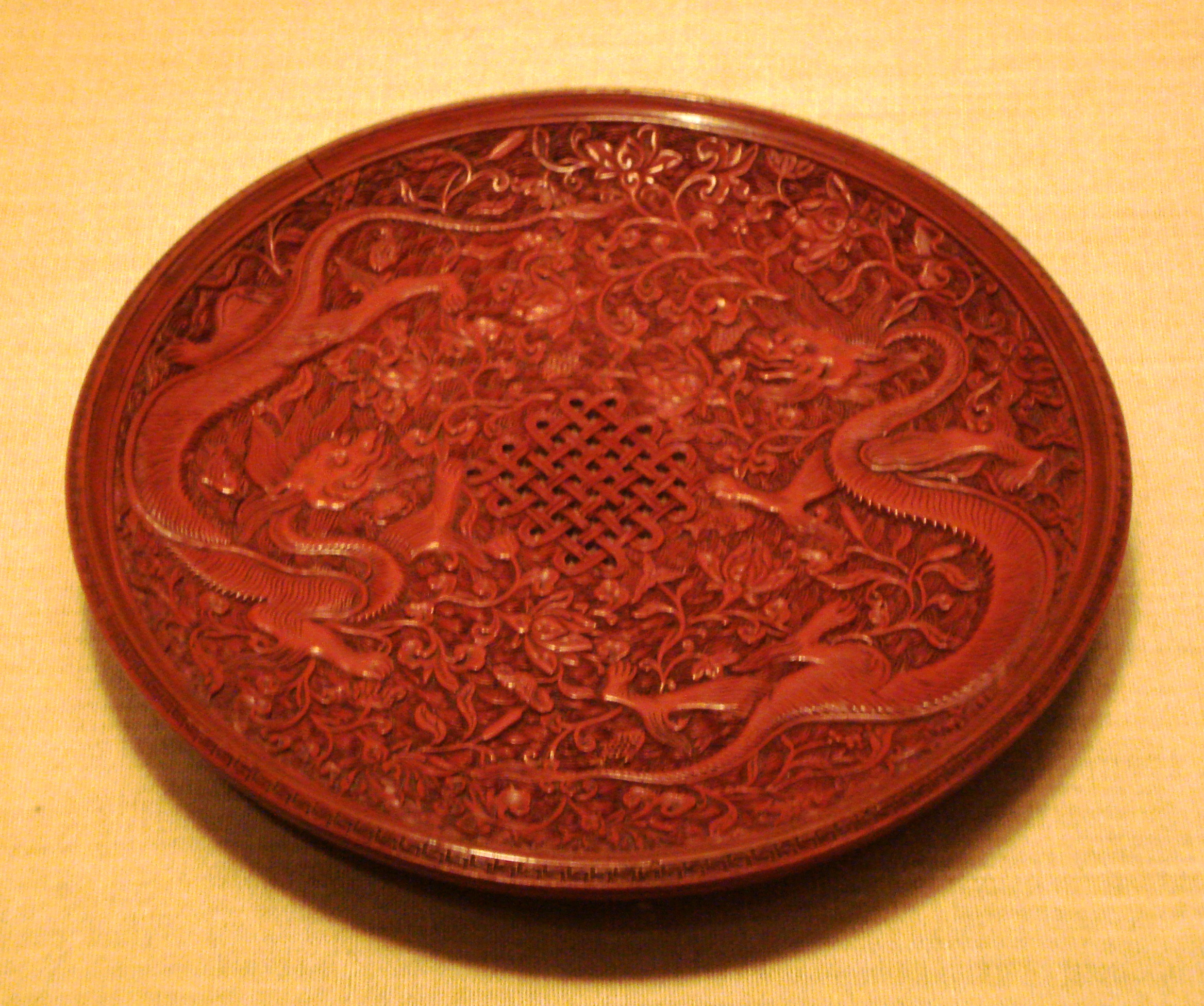
Ming dynasty red lacquerware dish with carved chrysanthemums and dragons

- The chrysanthemum is the city flower of Beijing and Kaifeng. The tradition of cultivating different varieties of chrysanthemums stretches back 1600 years, and the scale reached a phenomenal level during the Song dynasty until its loss to the Jürchens in 1126. The city has held the Kaifeng Chrysanthemum Cultural Festival since 1983 (renamed China Kaifeng Chrysanthemum Cultural Festival in 1994). The event is the largest chrysanthemum festival in China; it has been a yearly feature since, taking place between 18 October and 18 November every year.
- The chrysanthemum is one of the "Four Gentlemen" (四君子) of China (the others being the plum blossom, the orchid, and bamboo). The chrysanthemum is said to have been favored by Tao Qian, an influential Chinese poet, and is symbolic of nobility. It is also one of the four symbolic seasonal flowers.
- A chrysanthemum festival is held each year in Tongxiang, near Hangzhou, China.
- Chrysanthemums are the topic in hundreds of poems of China.
- The "golden flower" referred to in the 2006 movie Curse of the Golden Flower is a chrysanthemum.
- "Chrysanthemum Gate" (jú huā mén 菊花门), often abbreviated as Chrysanthemum (菊花), is taboo slang meaning "anus" (with sexual connotations).
- An ancient Chinese city (Xiaolan Town of Zhongshan City) was named Ju-Xian, meaning "chrysanthemum city".
- The plant is particularly significant during the Chinese Double Ninth Festival.
- In Chinese culture, the chrysanthemum is a symbol of autumn and the flower of the ninth moon. People even drank chrysanthemum wine on the ninth day of the ninth lunar month to prolong their lives during the Han dynasty. It is a symbol of longevity because of its health-giving properties. Because of all of this, the flower was often worn on funeral attire.
- Pharmacopoeia of the People's Republic of China listed two kinds of chrysanthemum for medical use, Yejuhua and Juhua. Historically Yejuhua is said to treat carbuncle, furuncle, conjunctivitis, headache, and vertigo. Juhua is said to treat cold, headache, vertigo, and conjunctivitis.

==== Japan ====
Imperial Standard of the Emperor of Japan

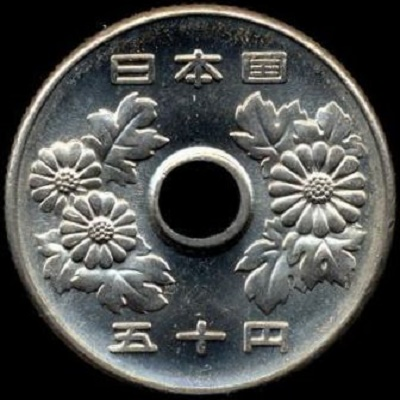
50 yen coin

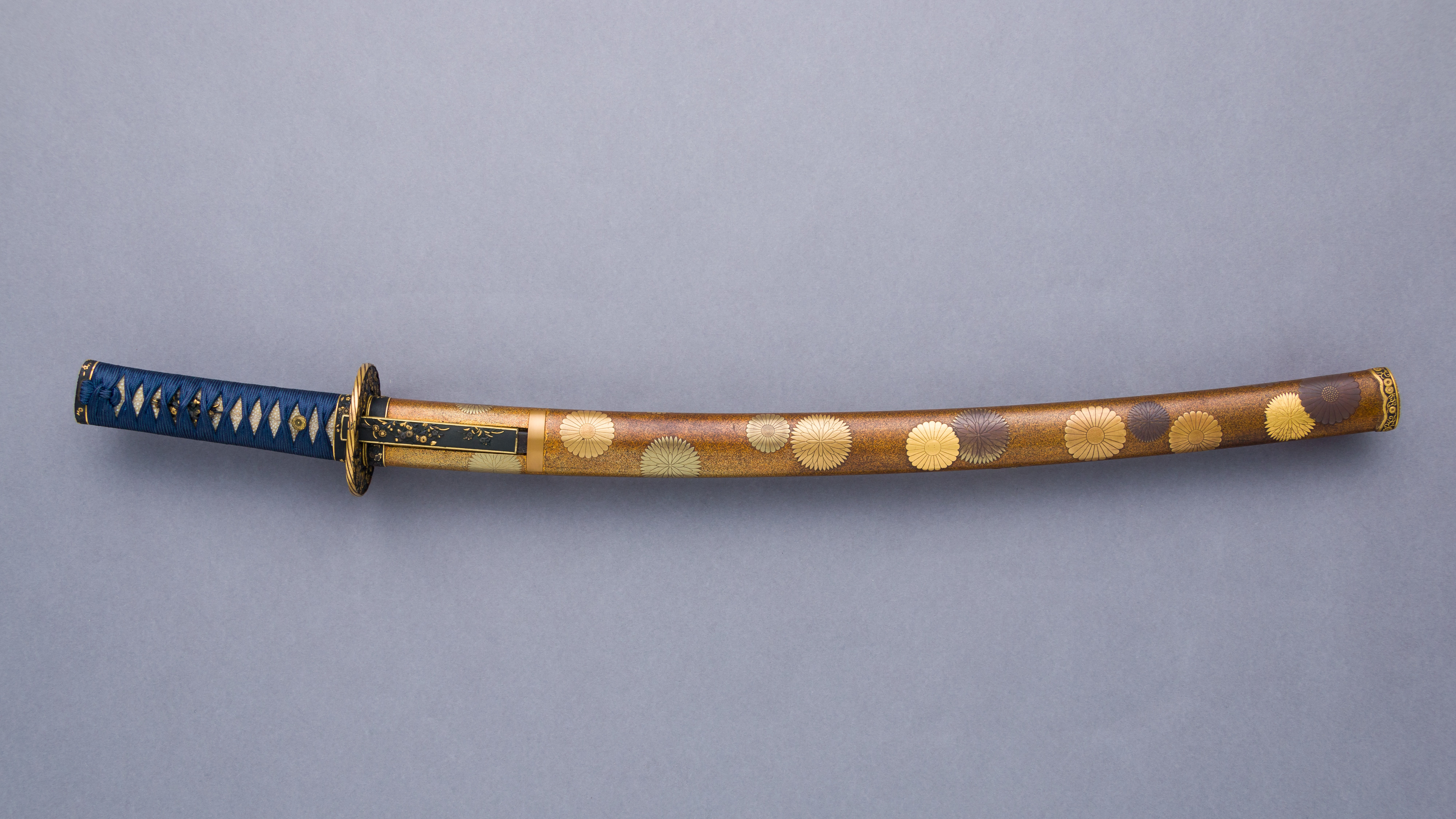
The scabbard of a wakizashi with chrysanthemums painted using maki-e, a decoration technique of Japanese lacquerware. 18th century, Edo period.

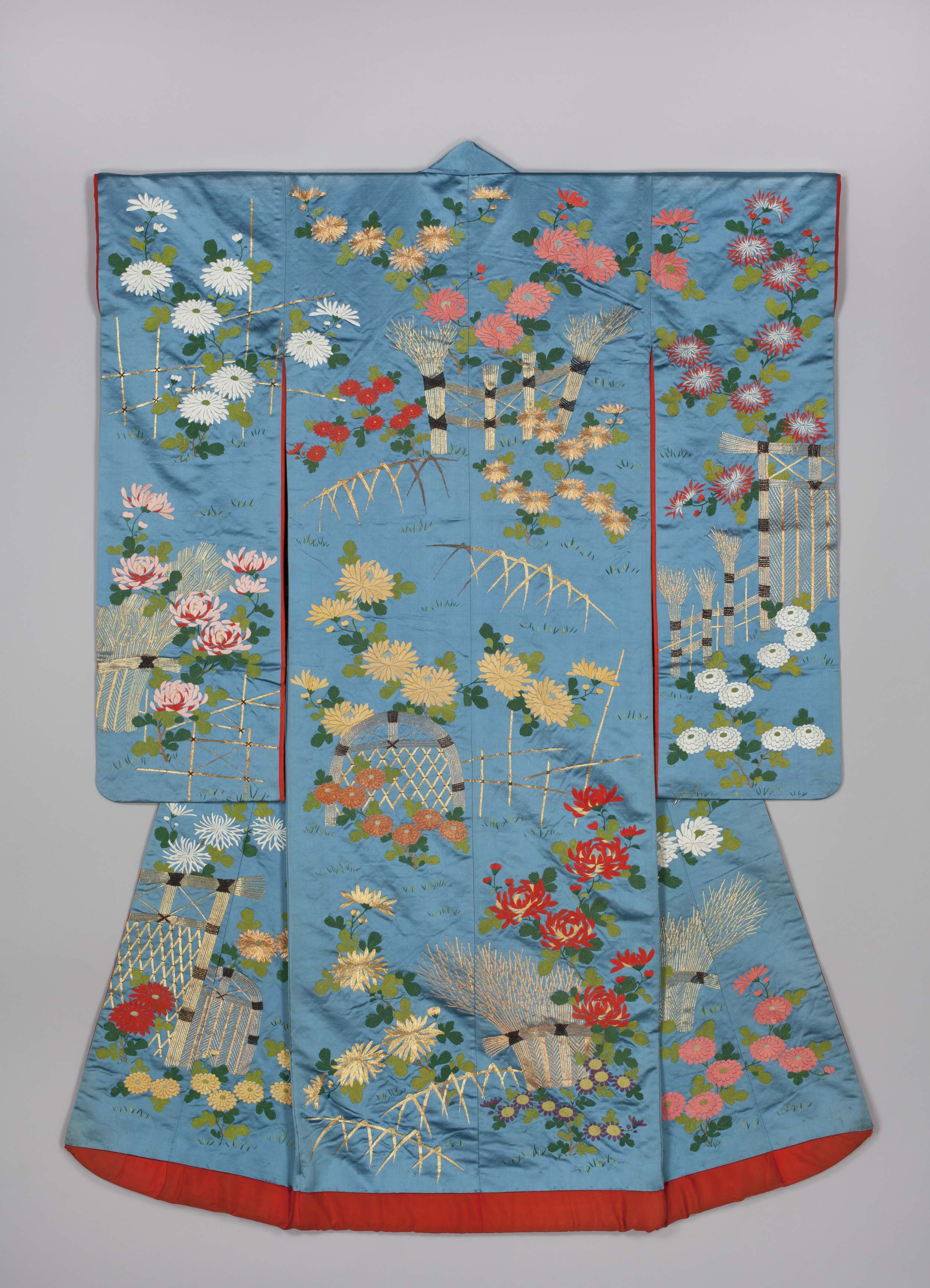
Outer Kimono for a Young Woman (Uchikake). Motif: Chrysanthemums and fences.

Chrysanthemums first arrived in Japan by way of China in the 5th century. The chrysanthemum has been used as a theme of waka (Japanese traditional poetry) since around the 10th century in the Heian period, and Kokin Wakashū is the most famous of them. In the 12th century, during the Kamakura period, when the retired Emperor Go-Toba adopted it as the mon (family crest) of the Imperial family, it became a flower that symbolized autumn in Japan. During the Edo period from the 17th century to the 19th century, due to the development of economy and culture, the cultivation of chrysanthemums, cherry blossoms, Japanese iris, morning glory, etc. became popular, many cultivars were created and many chrysanthemum exhibitions were held. From the Meiji period in the latter half of the 19th century, due to the growing importance of the chrysanthemum, which symbolized the Imperial family, the creation of ogiku style cultivars with a diameter of 20 cm or more became popular.

In the present day, each autumn there are chrysanthemum exhibitions at the Shinjuku Gyo-en, Meiji Shrine and Yasukuni Shrine in Tokyo. The Yasukuni Shrine, formerly a state-endowed shrine (官国弊社, kankokuheisha) has adopted the chrysanthemum crest. Culinary-grade chrysanthemums are used to decorate food, and they remain a common motif for traditional Japanese arts like porcelain, lacquerware and kimono.

Chrysanthemum growing is still practised actively as a hobby by many Japanese people who enter prize plants in contests. Chrysanthemum "dolls", often depicting fictional characters from both traditional sources like kabuki and contemporary sources like Disney, are displayed throughout the fall months, and the city of Nihonmatsu hosts the "Nihonmatsu Chrysanthemum Dolls Exhibition" every autumn in historical ruin of Nihonmatsu Castle. They are also grown into chrysanthemum bonsai forms.

- In Japan, the chrysanthemum is a symbol of the Emperor and the Imperial family. In particular, a "chrysanthemum crest" (菊花紋章, kikukamonshō or kikkamonshō), i.e. a mon of chrysanthemum blossom design, indicates a link to the Emperor; there are more than 150 patterns of this design. Notable uses of and reference to the Imperial chrysanthemum include:
  - The imperial crest of Japan is used by members of the Japanese imperial family. In 1869, a two-layered, 16-petal design was designated as the symbol of the emperor. Princes used a simpler, single-layer pattern.
  - The Chrysanthemum Throne is the name given to the position of Japanese Emperor and the throne.
  - The Supreme Order of the Chrysanthemum is a Japanese honor awarded by the emperor on the advice of the Japanese government.
  - In Imperial Japan, small arms were required to be stamped with the imperial chrysanthemum, as they were considered the personal property of the emperor.
- The Nagoya Castle Chrysanthemum Competition started after the end of the Pacific War. The event at the castle has become a tradition for the city. With three categories, it is one of the largest events of its kind in the region by both scale and content. The first category is the exhibition of cultivated flowers. The second category is for bonsai flowers, which are combined with dead pieces of wood to give the illusion of miniature trees. The third category is the creation of miniature landscapes.
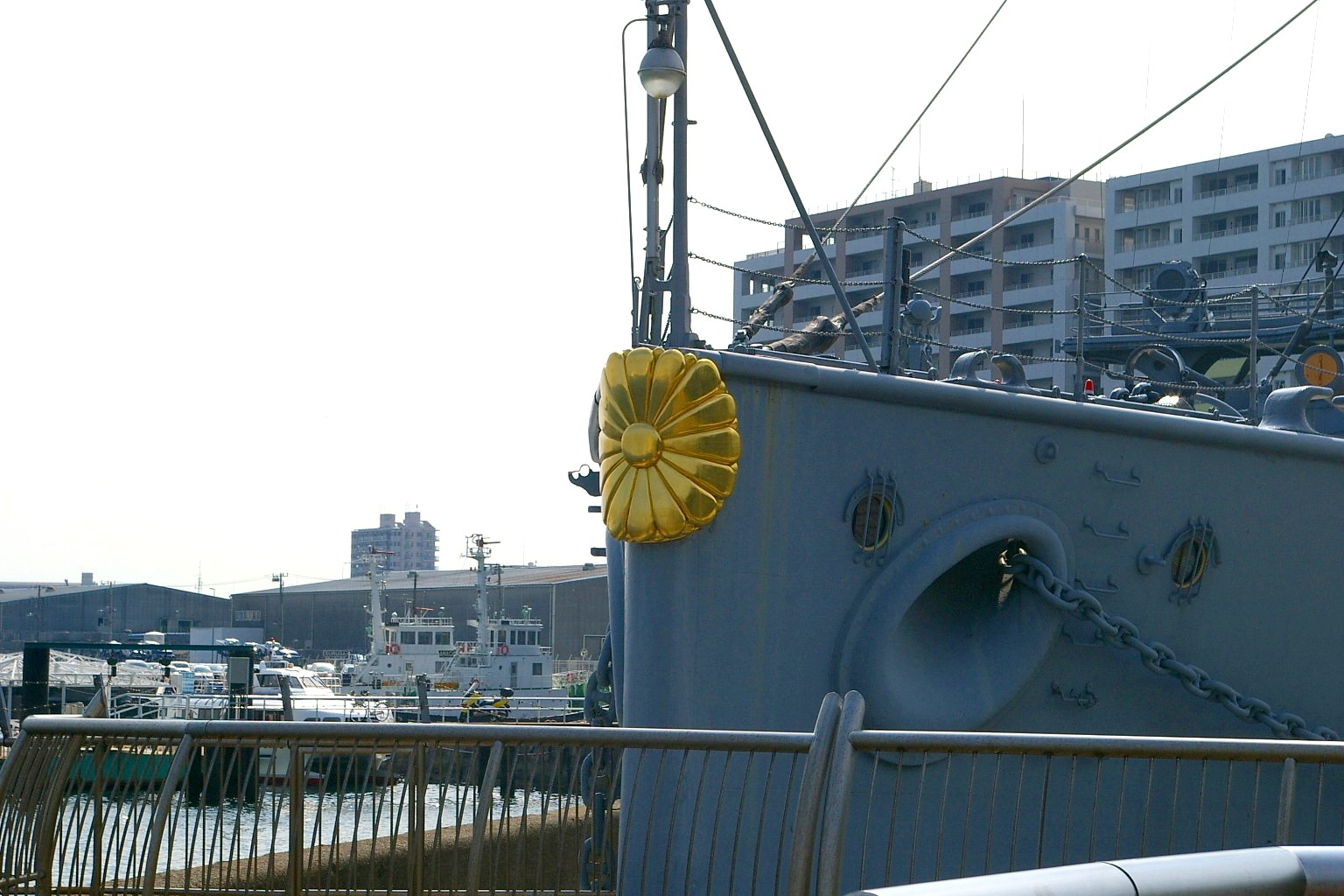
Chrysanthemum crest on the battleship Mikasa

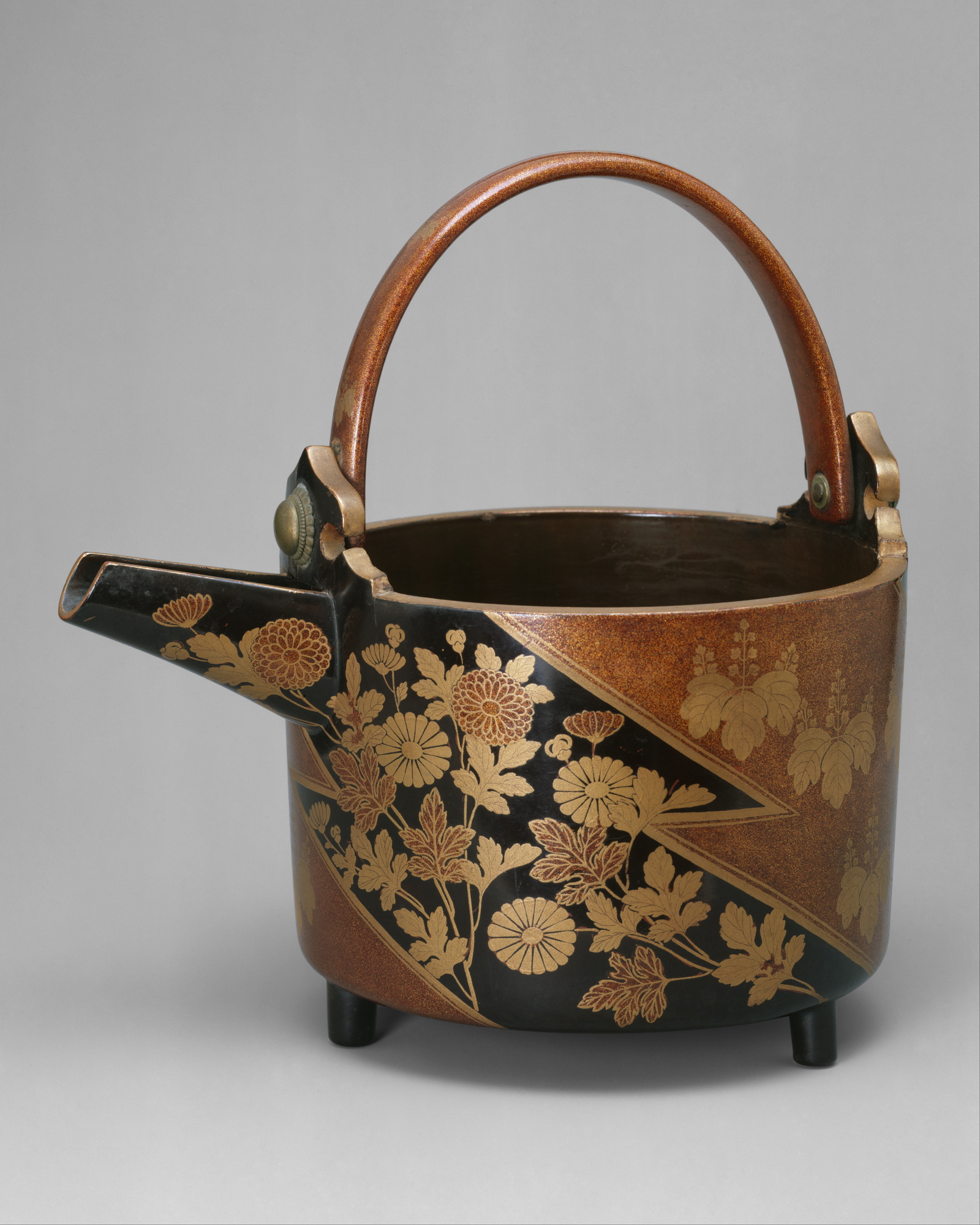
Maki-e Sake Ewer with Chrysanthemums and Paulownia Crests in Alternating Fields. Early 17th century, Azuchi–Momoyama period.

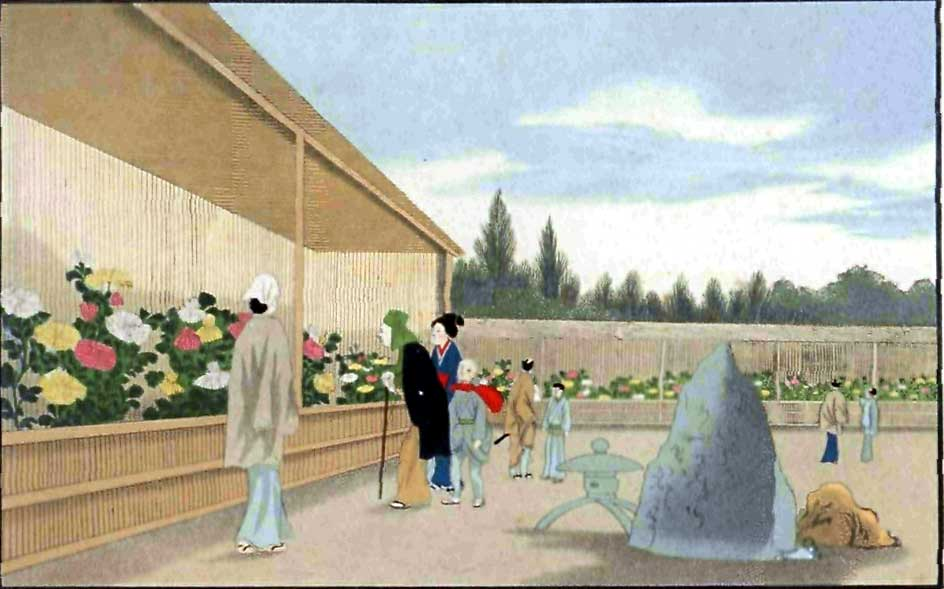
Chrysanthemum shows have been traditionally held in many Japanese towns.

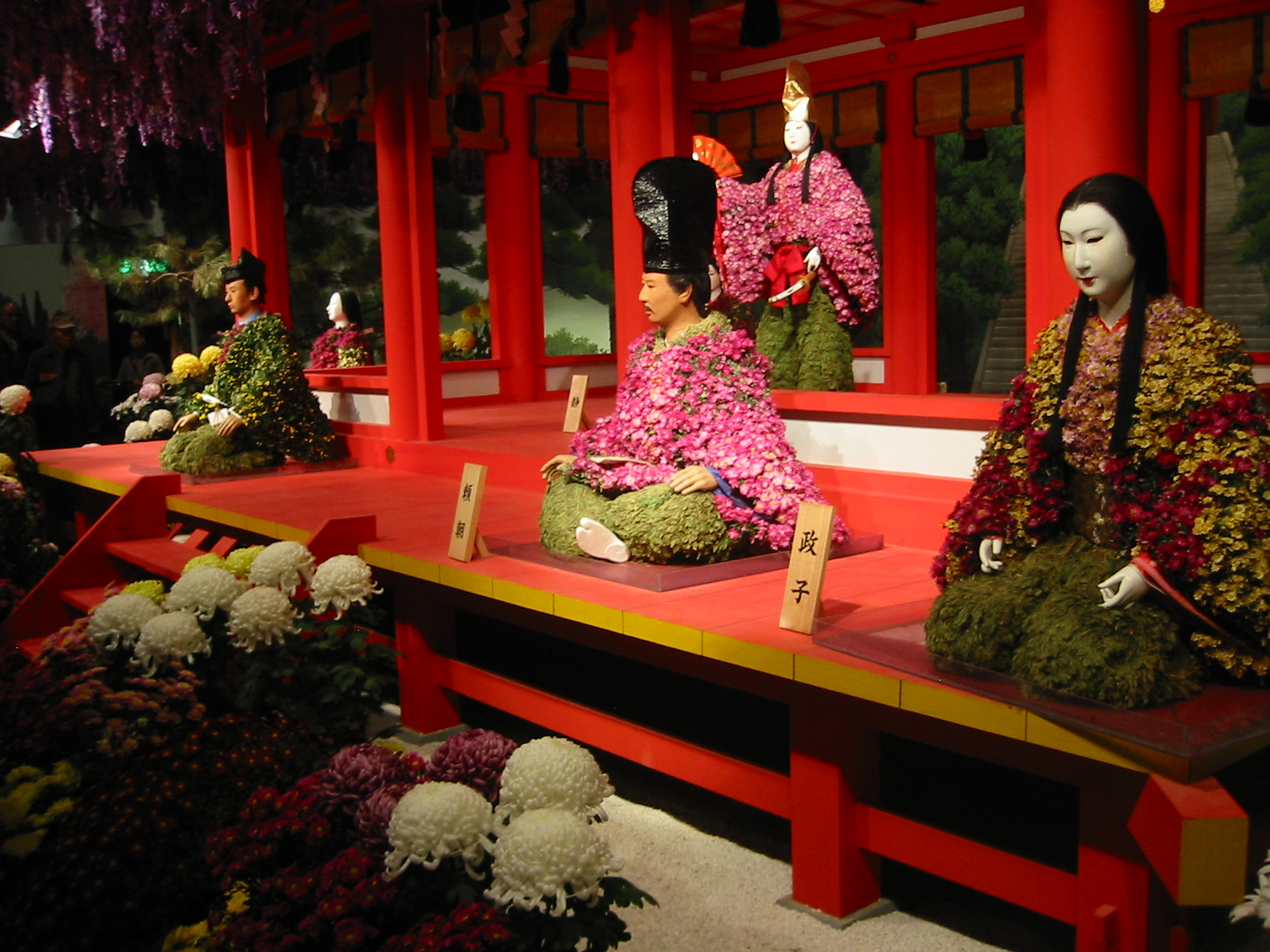
"Hirakata Chrysanthemum Dolls Exhibition" (2005)

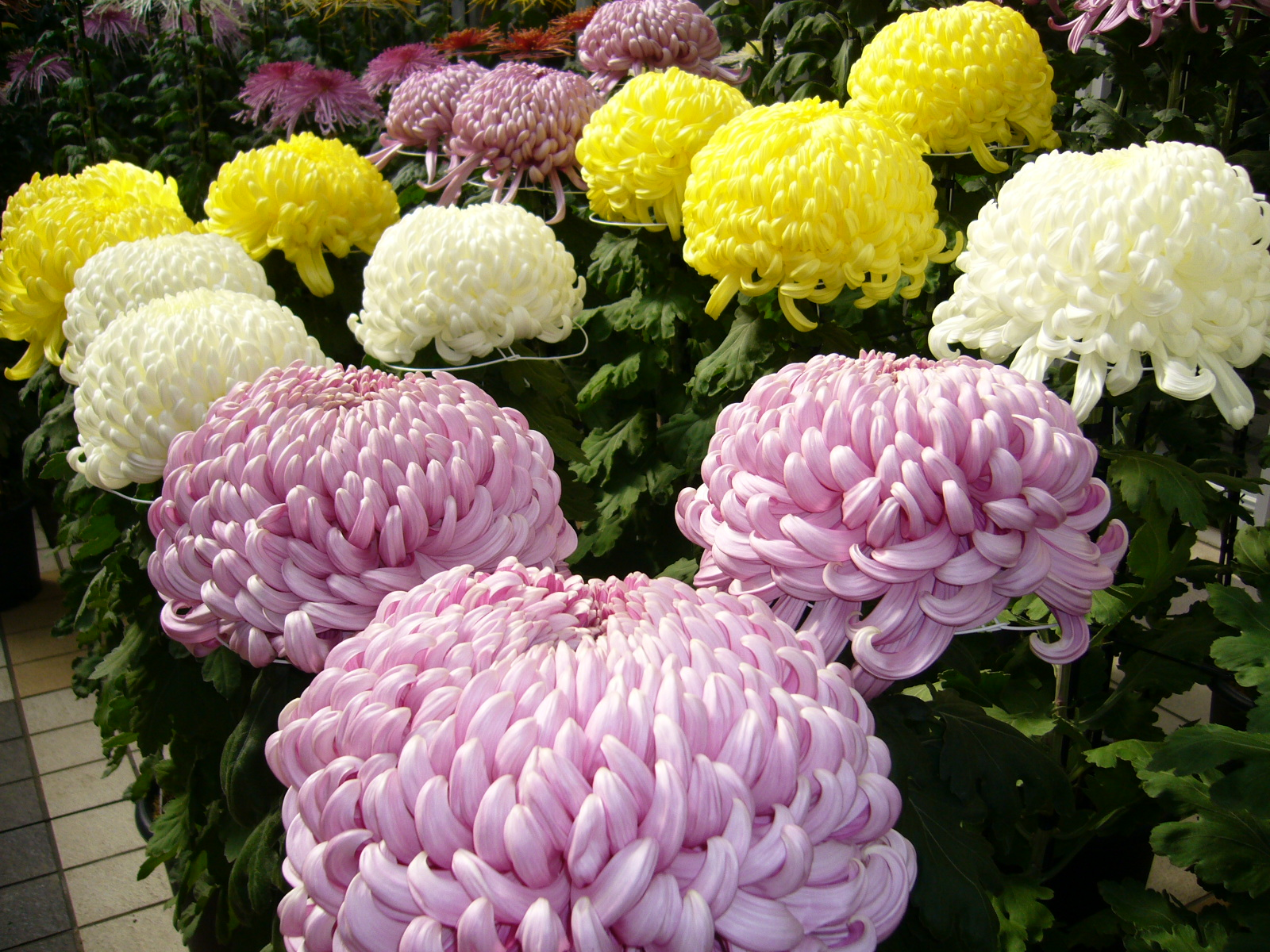
Chrysanthemums in the Japanese Ogiku (lit., great chrysanthemum) style

==== Korea ====
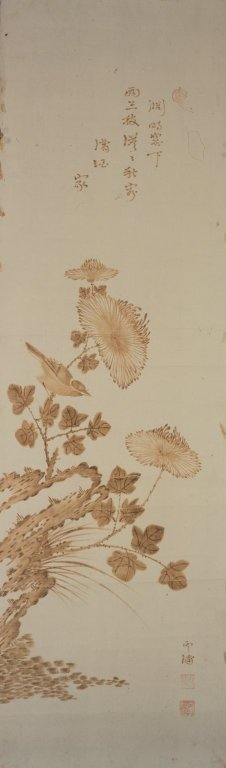
19th-century Korean painting

The flower is found extensively in inlaid Goreyo ware and were reproduced in stamp form in Buncheong wares. Several twentieth century potters, especially Kim Se-yong, created double-wall wares featuring each individual petal painted in white clay against a celadon background. A vase produced using this technique and presented in 1999 to Queen Elizabeth II can be found in the Royal Collection.

Laying a wreath of white chrysanthemums to mourn at funerals has been common since the early 20th century. Before the 20th century, white clothing was traditionally worn in funeral settings. However, the introduction of Western culture made black the prevalent color. White chrysanthemums were instead used to preserve the tradition of using white to mourn at funerals.

Korea has a number of flower shows that exhibit the chrysanthemum, such as the Masan Gagopa Chrysanthemum Festival.

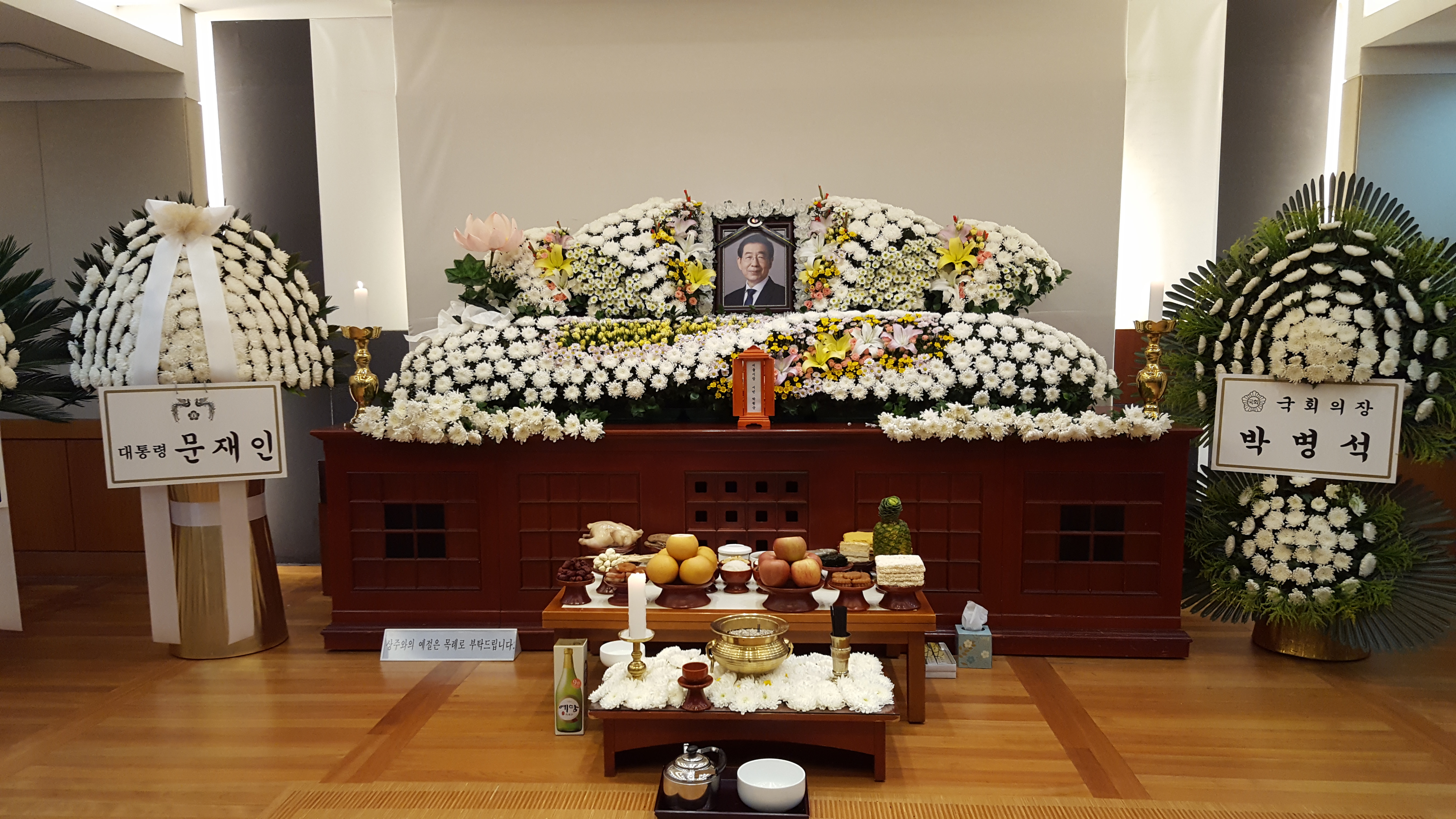
White chrysanthemums at a Korean funeral parlor

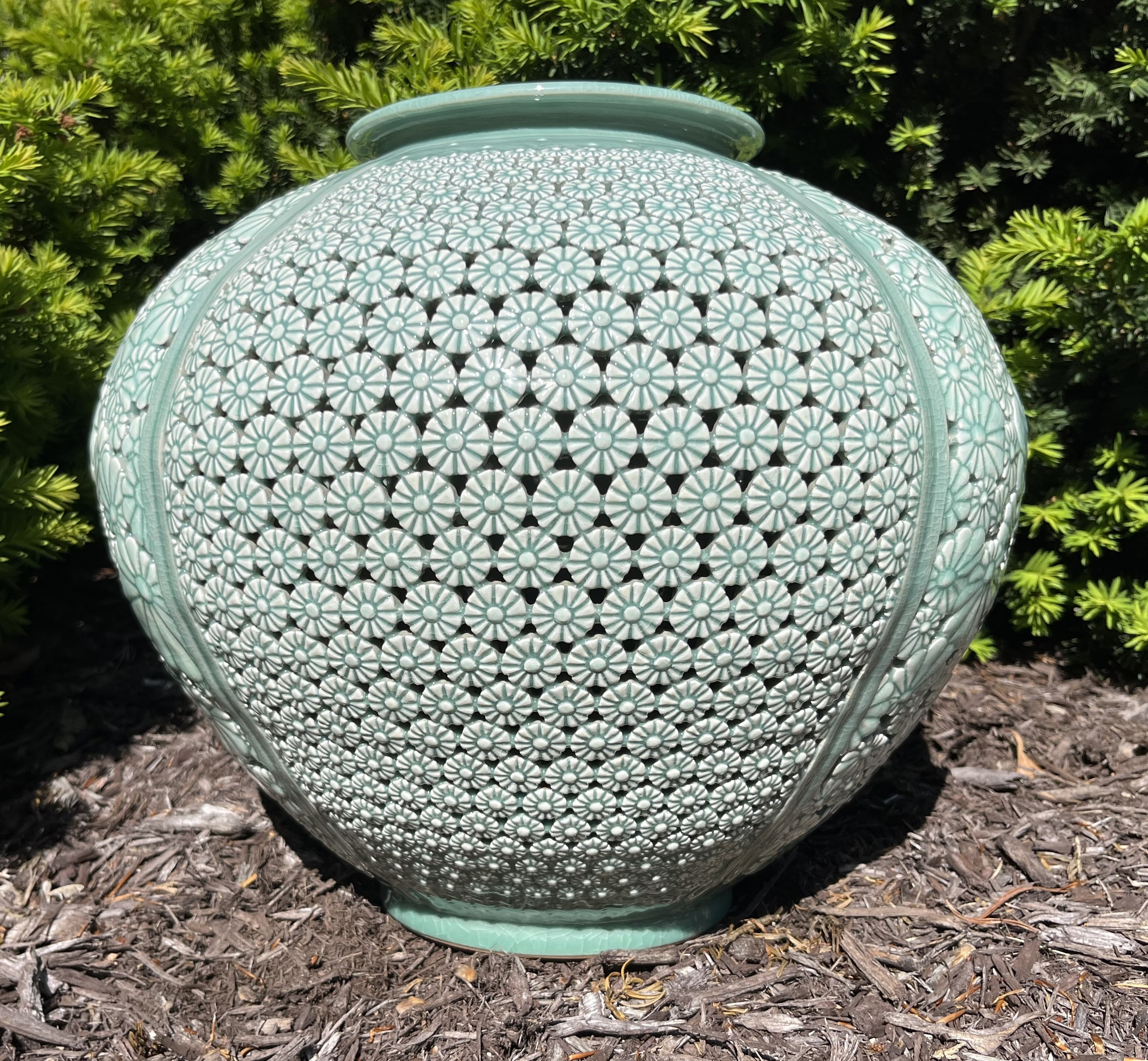
celadon moon jar with chrysanthemums, Kim Se-yong

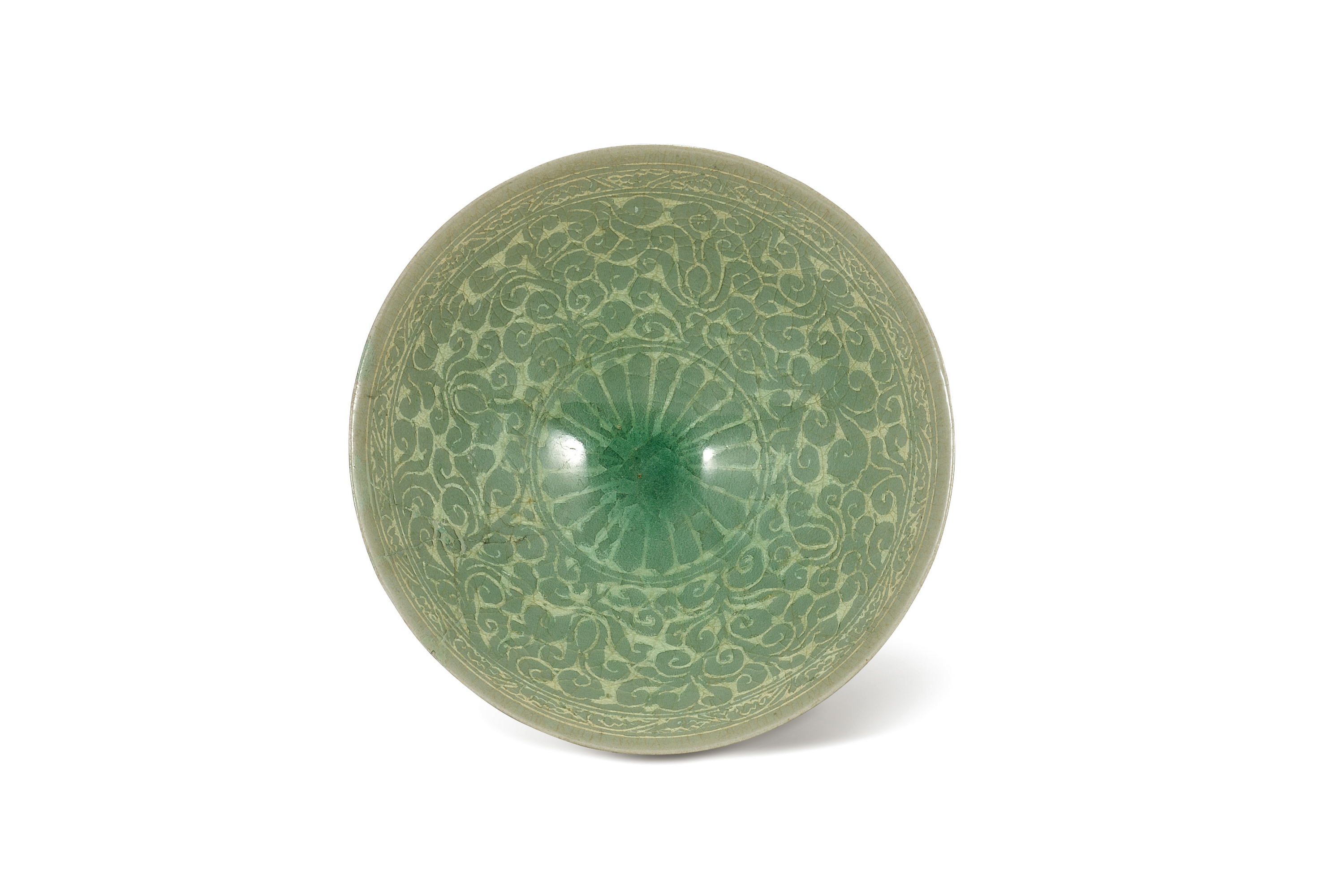
Goryeo ware bowl with chrysanthemum inscription. early 11th century, Goryeo dynasty.

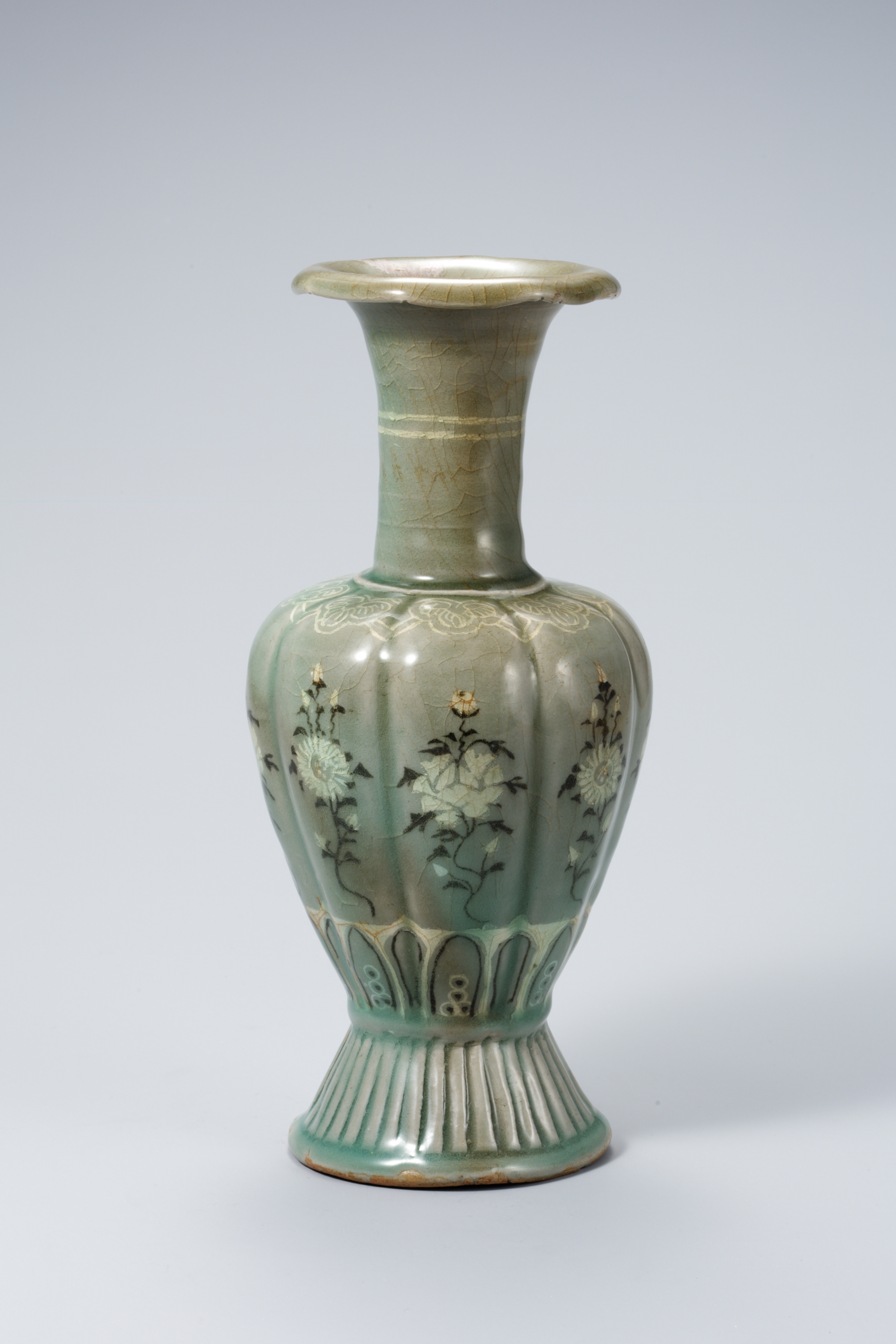
Celadon inlaid peony and chrysanthemum pattern melon-shaped bottle, Goryeo dynasty

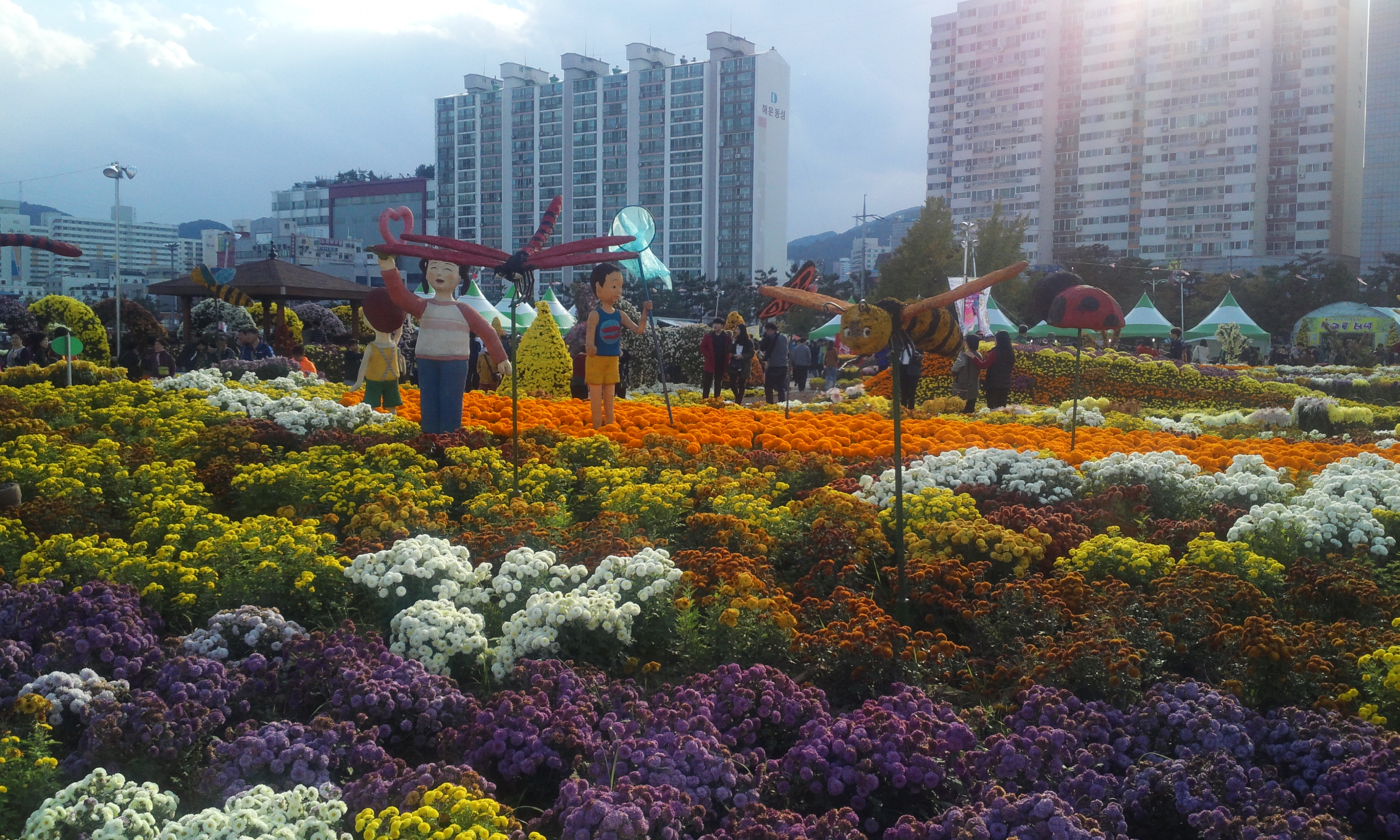
Masan Gagopa Chrysanthemum Festival

=== West Asia ===
==== Iran ====
In Iran, chrysanthemums are associated with the Zoroastrian spiritual being Ashi Vanghuhi (lit. 'good blessings, rewards'), a female Yazad (angel) presiding over blessings.

=== Oceania ===
==== Australia ====
In Australia, on Mother's Day, which falls in May when the flower is in season, people traditionally wear a white chrysanthemum, or a similar white flower to honour their mothers. Chrysanthemums are often given as Mother's Day presents.

=== North America ===
==== United States ====
- On 5 and 6 November 1883, in Philadelphia, the Pennsylvania Horticultural Society (PHS), at the request of the Florists and Growers Society, held its first Chrysanthemum Show in Horticultural Hall. This would be the first of several chrysanthemum events presented by PHS to the public.
- The founding of the chrysanthemum industry dates back to 1884, when the Enomoto brothers of Redwood City, California, grew the first chrysanthemums cultivated in America.
- In 1913, Sadakasu Enomoto (of San Mateo County) astounded the flower world by successfully shipping a carload of Turner chrysanthemums to New Orleans for the All Saints Day Celebration.
- The chrysanthemum was recognized as the official flower of the city of Chicago by Mayor Richard J. Daley in 1966.
- The chrysanthemum is the official flower of the city of Salinas, California.
- The chrysanthemum is the official flower of several fraternities and sororities, including Chi Phi, Phi Kappa Sigma, Phi Mu Alpha Sinfonia, Lambda Kappa Sigma, Sigma Alpha, and Triangle Fraternity.

=== Europe ===
==== Italy ====
Italian composer Giacomo Puccini wrote Crisantemi (1890), a movement for string quartet, in memory of his friend Amedeo di Savoia Duca d'Aosta. In Italy (and other European countries) the chrysanthemum is the flower that people traditionally bring to their deceased loved ones at the cemetery and is generally associated with mourning. A probable reason for this is the fact that the plant flowers between the end of October and the beginning of November, coinciding with the Day of the Dead (2 November).

==== Poland ====
Chrysanthemums are placed on graves to honor the dead during All Saints' Day and All Souls' Day in Poland.

==== United Kingdom ====
The UK National Collection of hardy chrysanthemums is at Hill Close Gardens near Warwick.

== Gallery ==
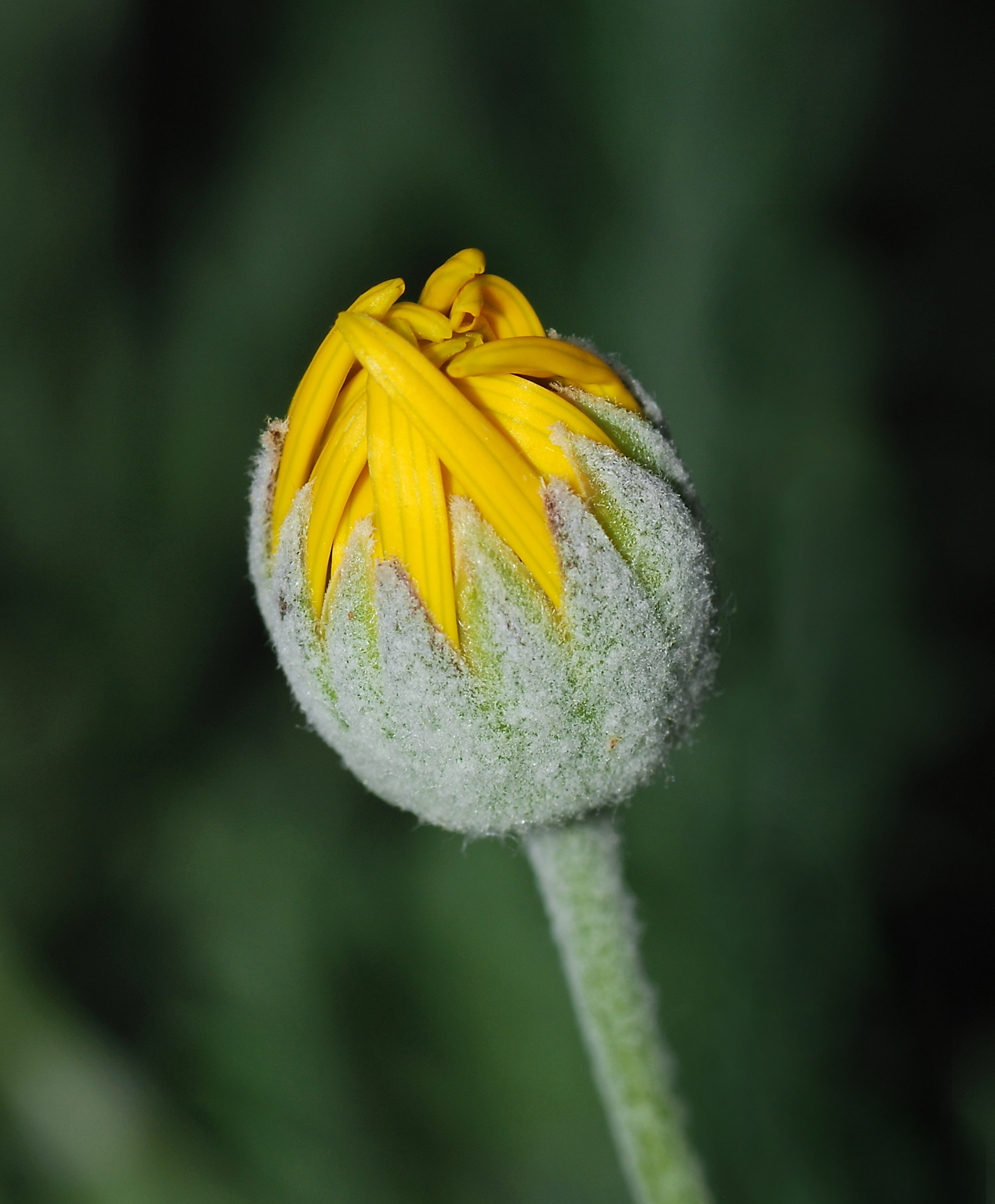
Bud of a garden chrysanthemum

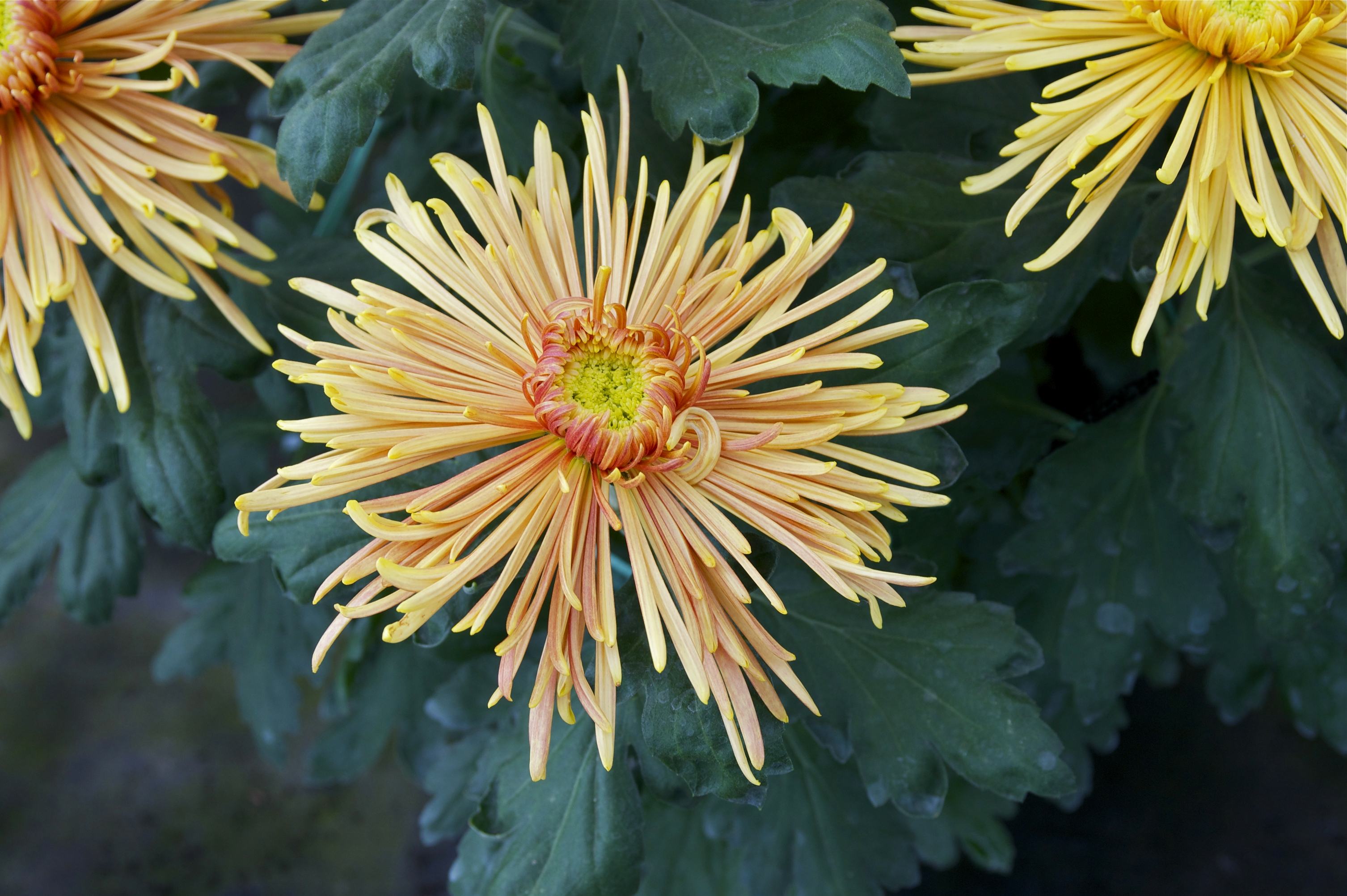
Chrysanthemum × morifolium 'Tokyo'

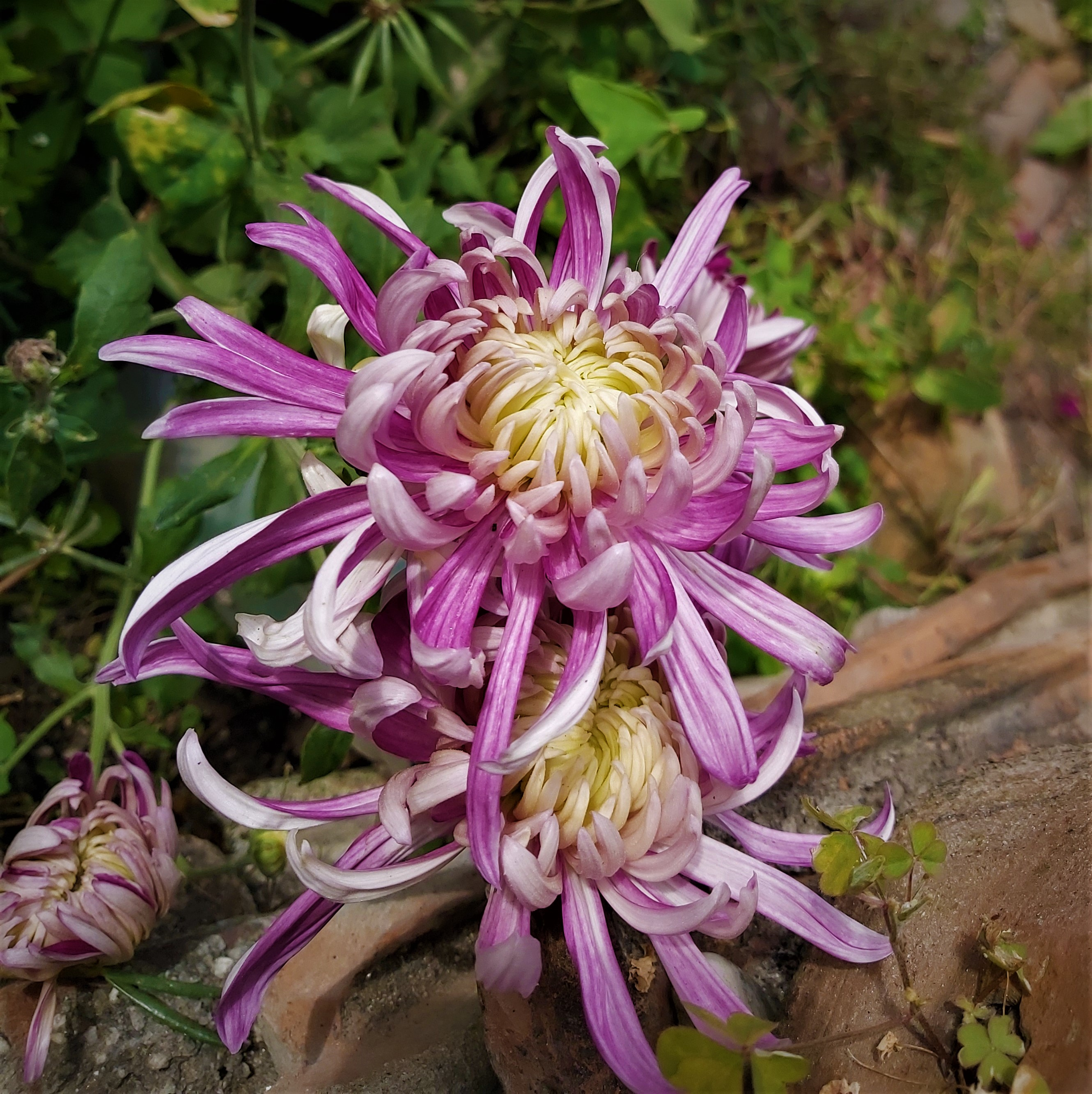
Purple Chrysanthemum

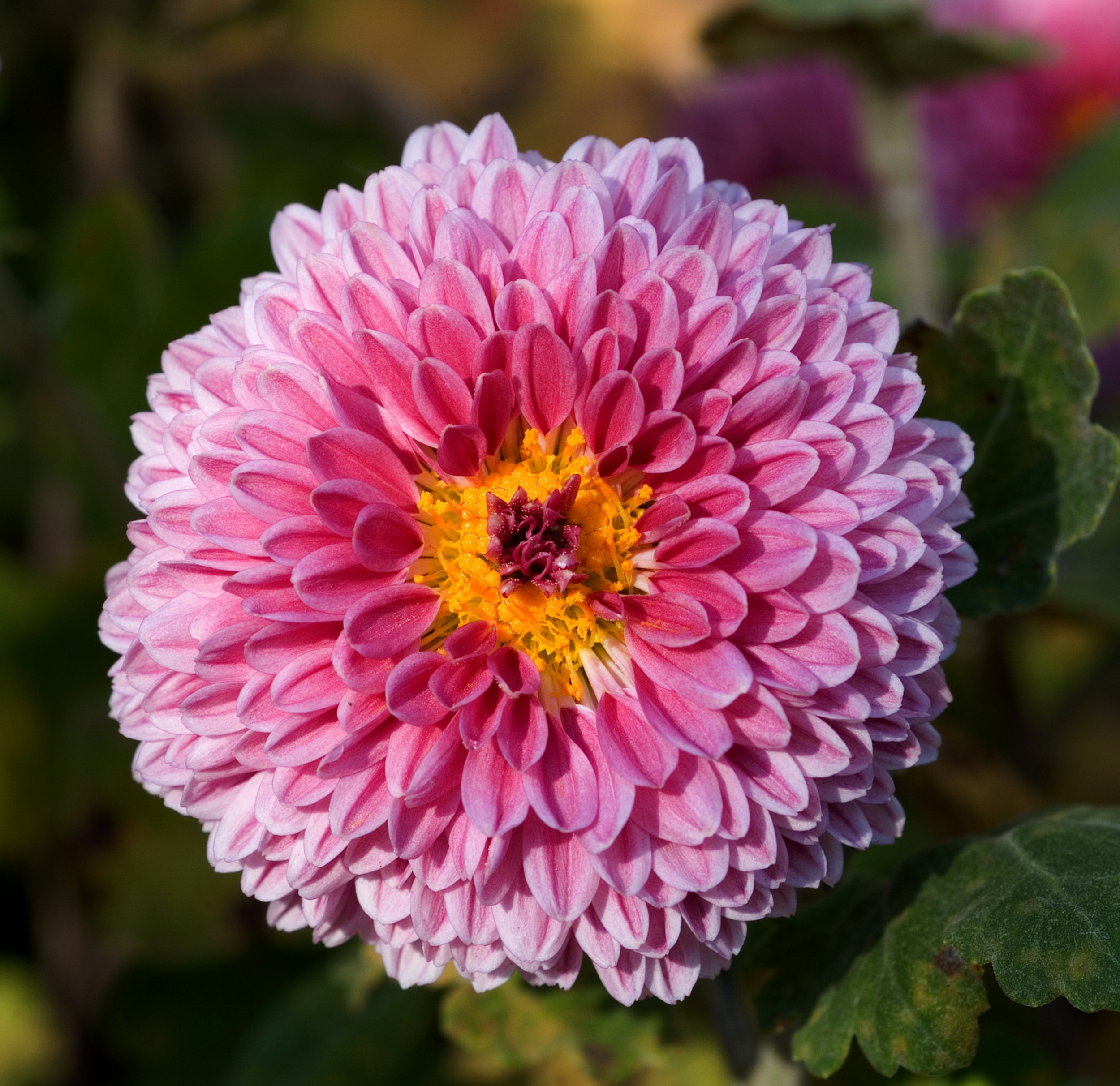
pink Chrysanthemum × morifolium

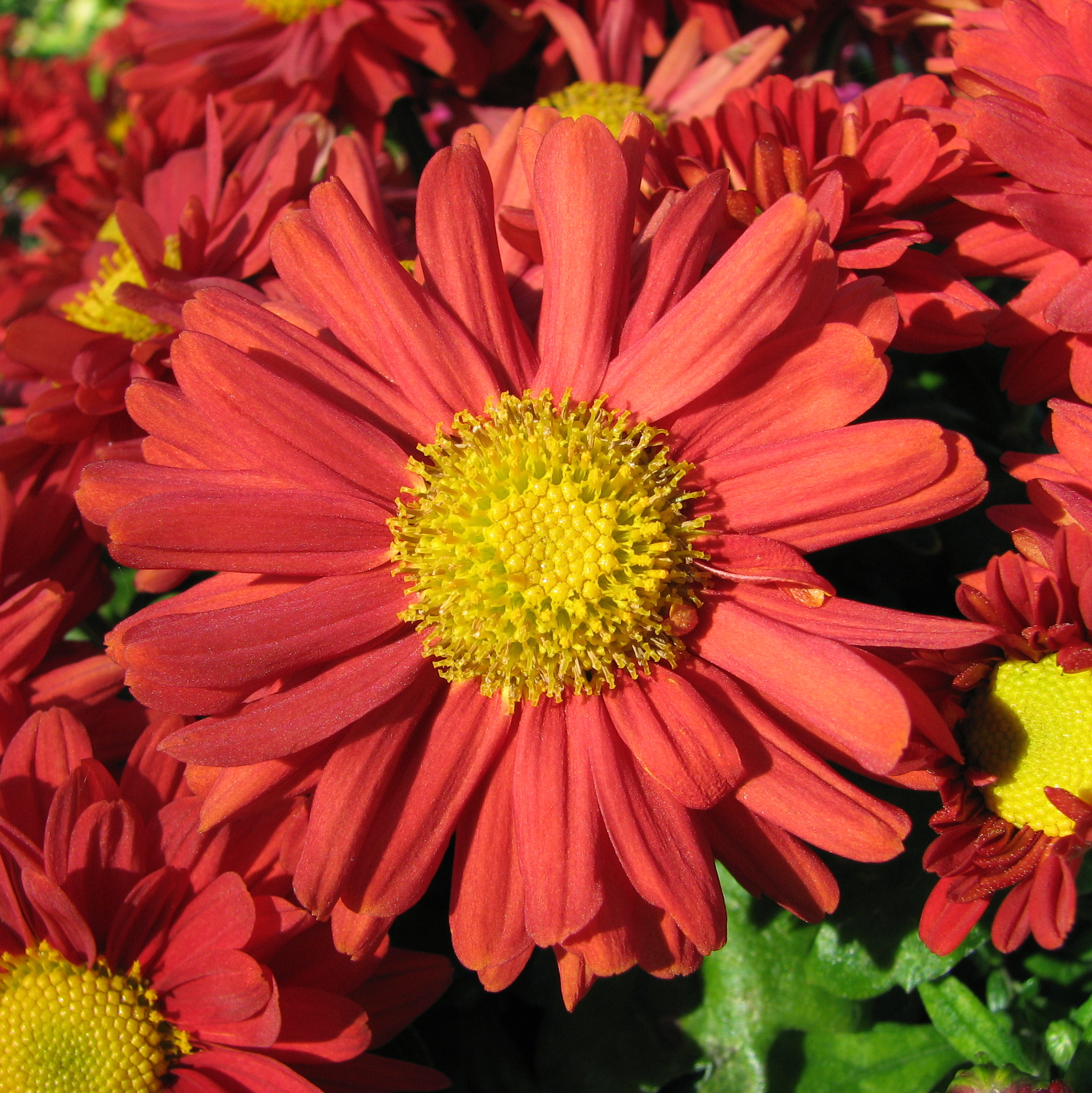
Red chrysanthemum

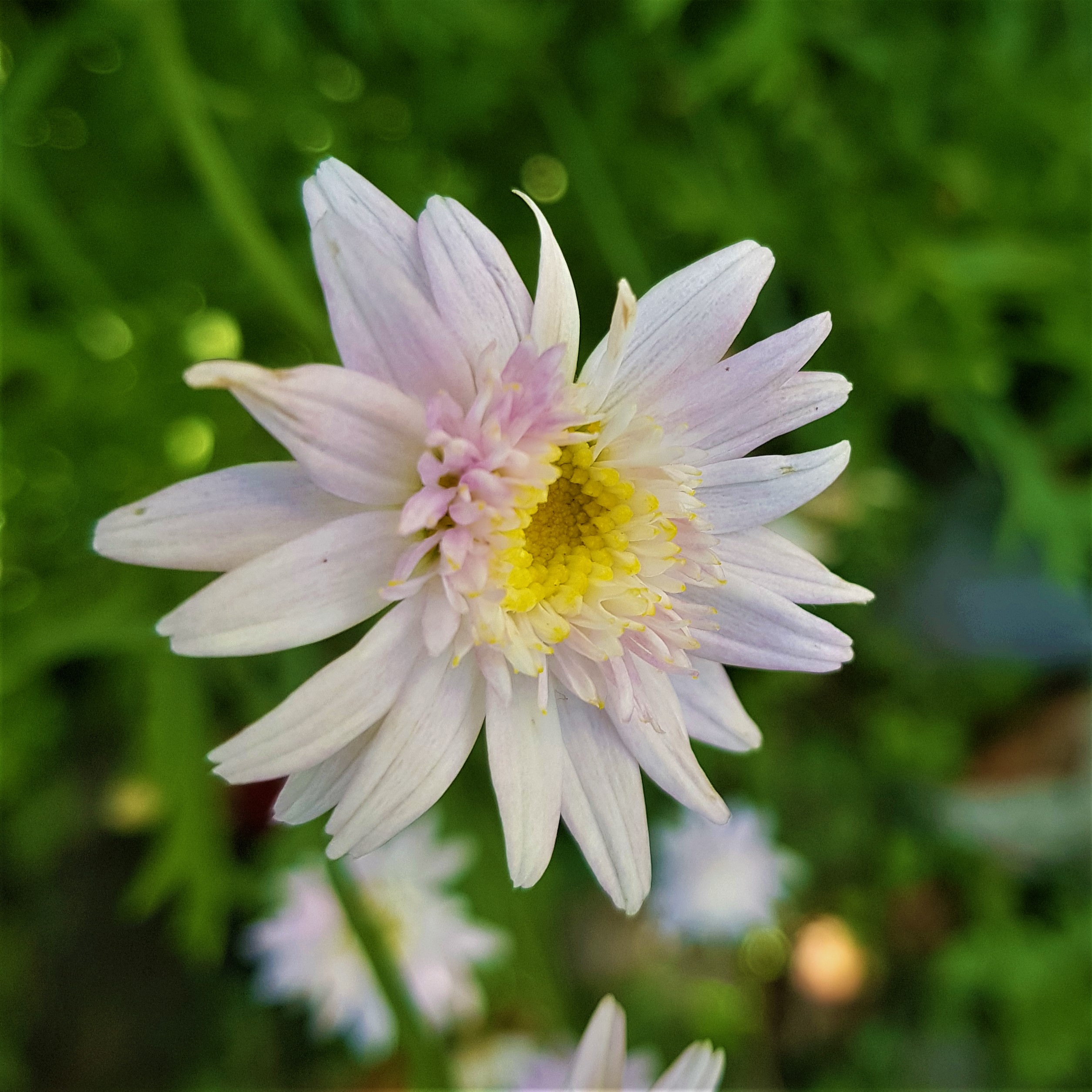
Closeup view of White Chrysanthemum

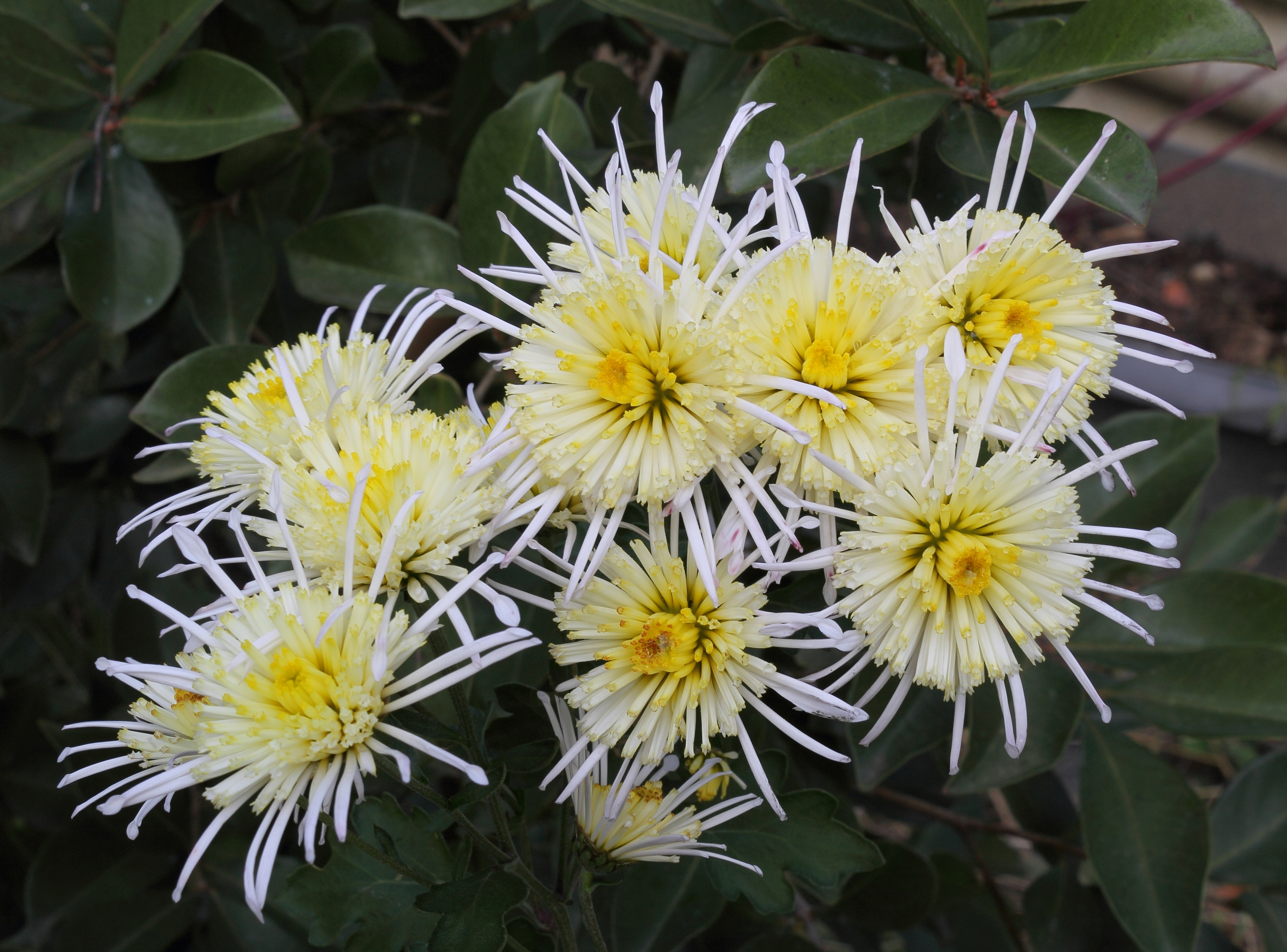
Chrysanthemum × morifolium 'Vesuvius'

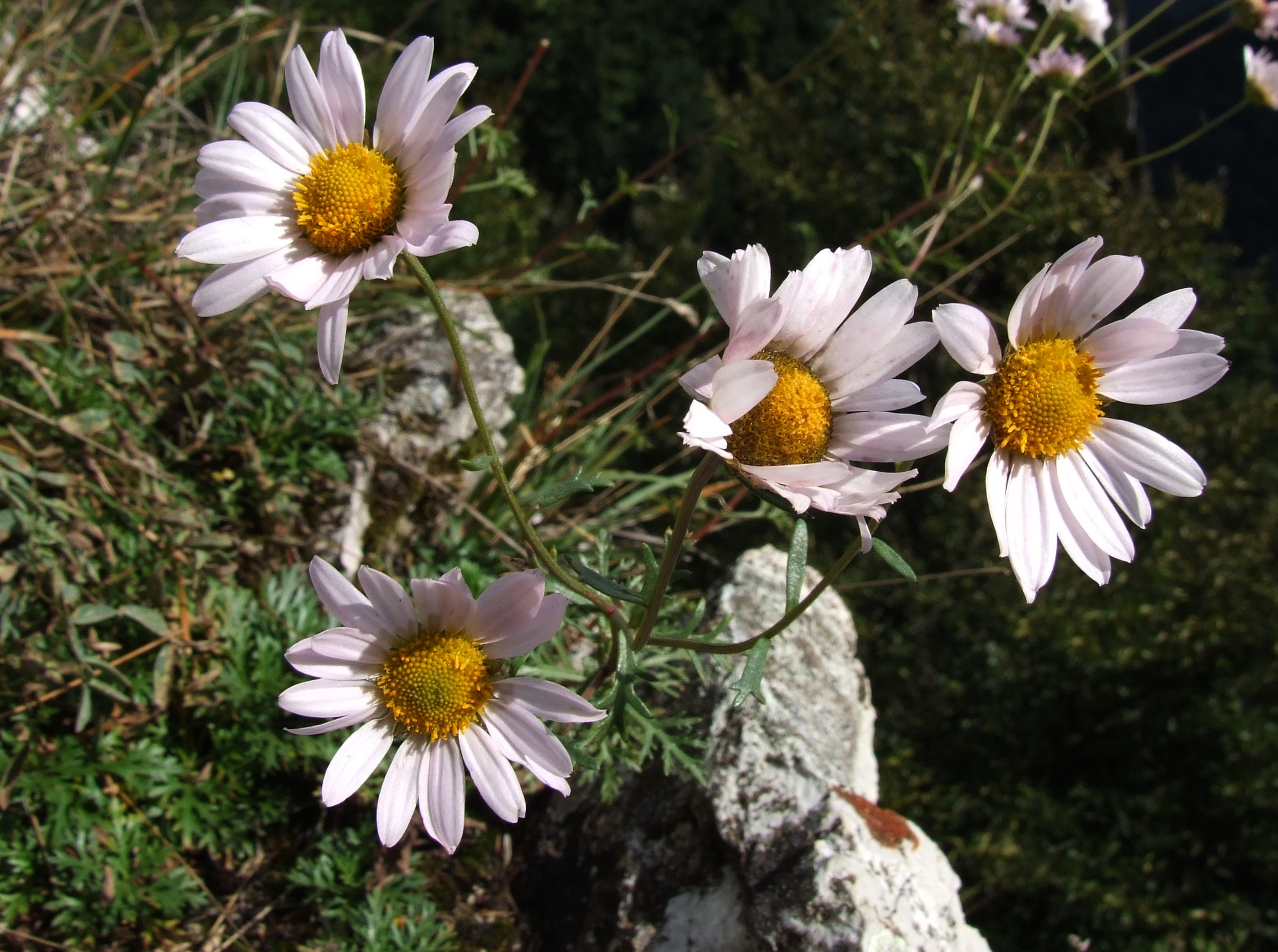
Chrysanthemum zawadskii

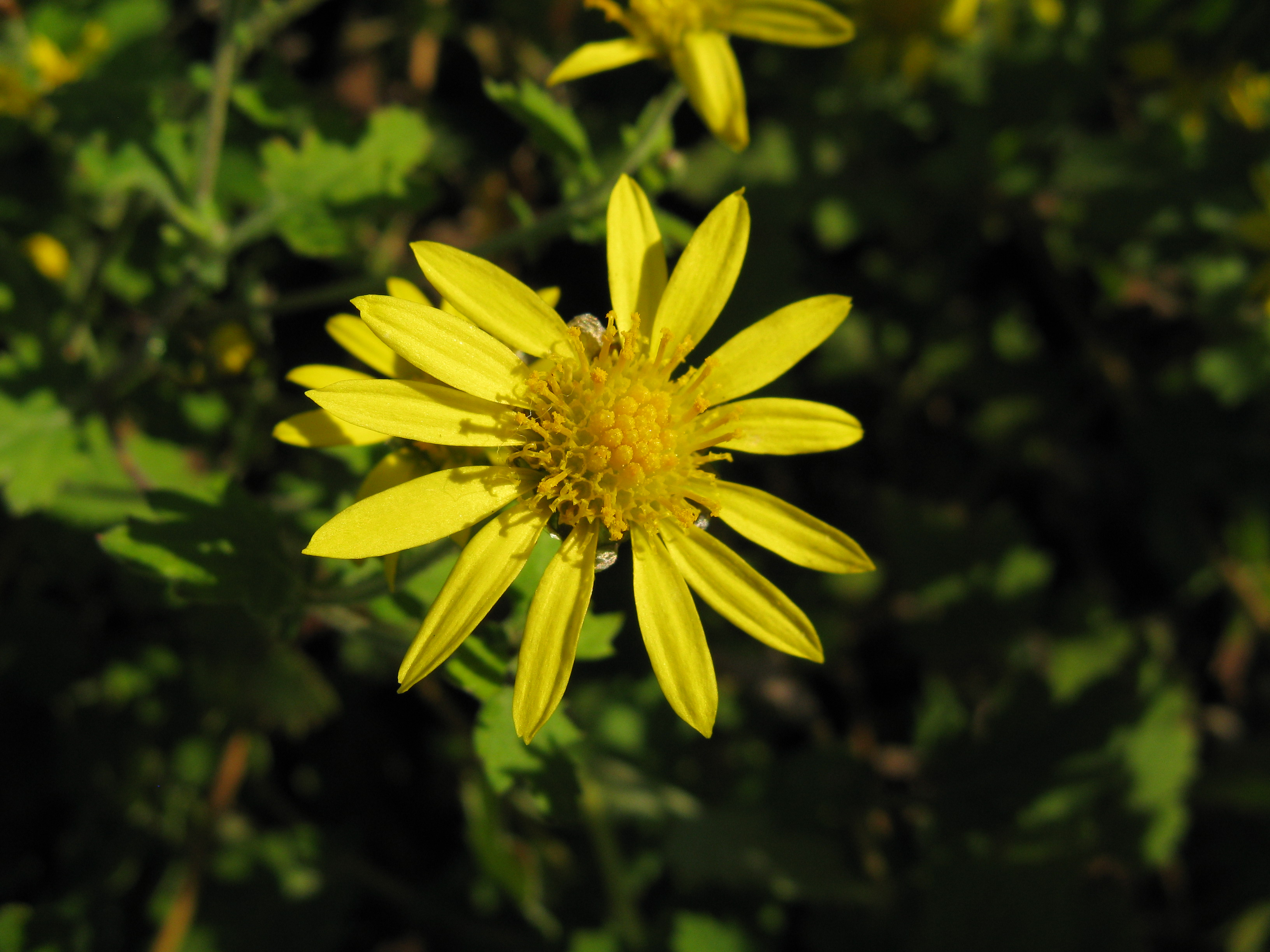
Chrysanthemum indicum

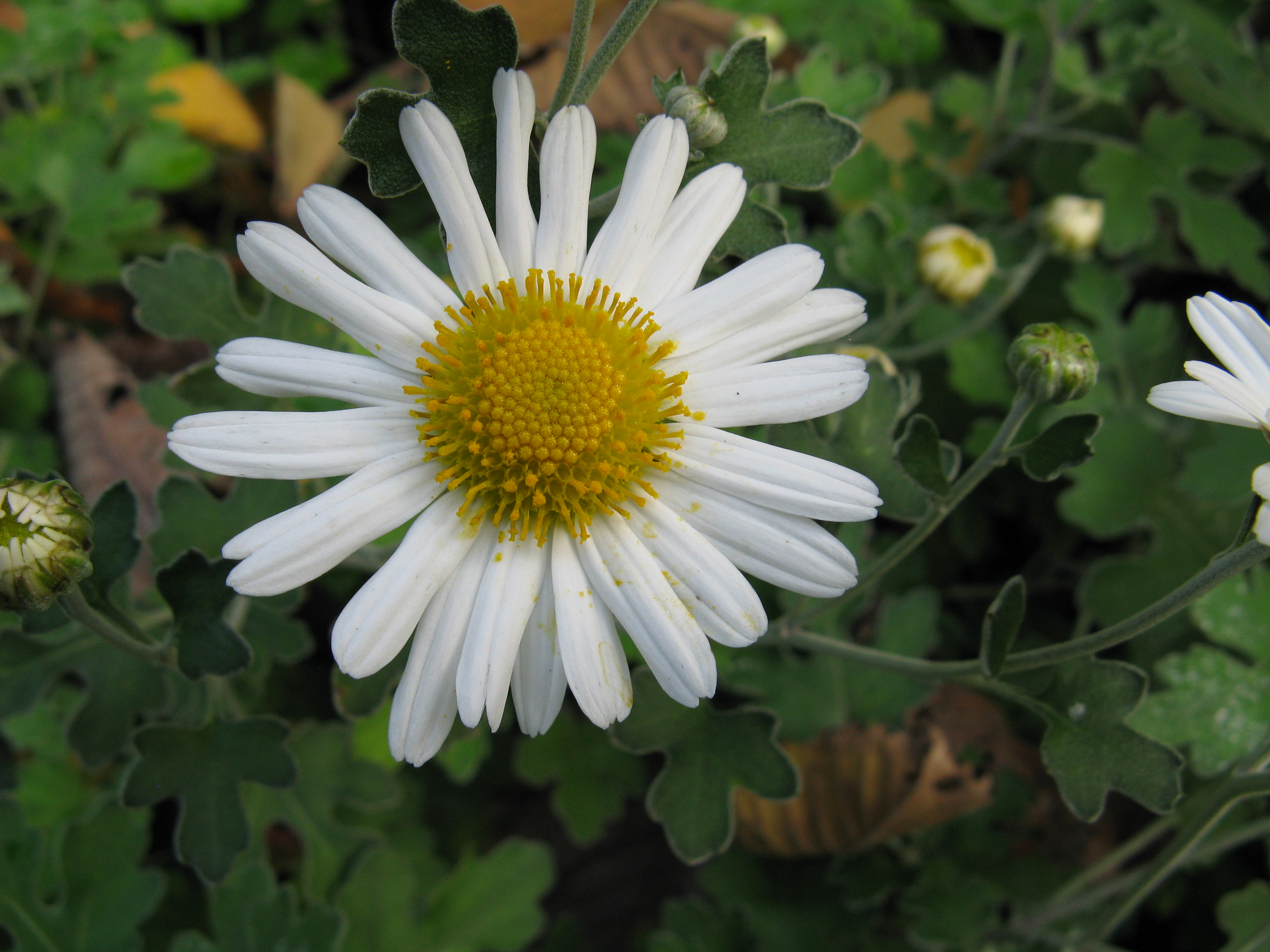
Chrysanthemum japonense var. ashizuriense

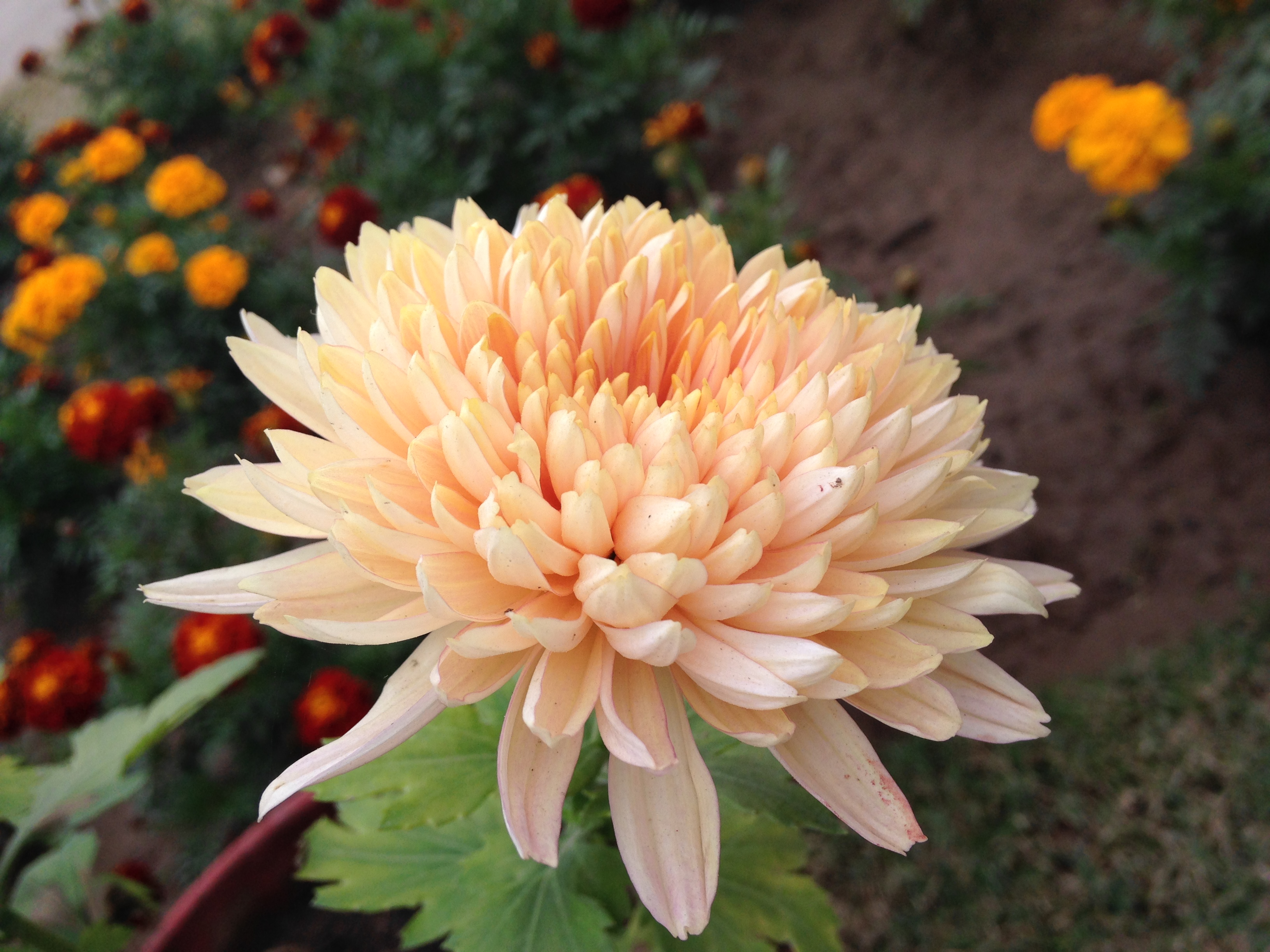
A peach coloured chrysanthemum

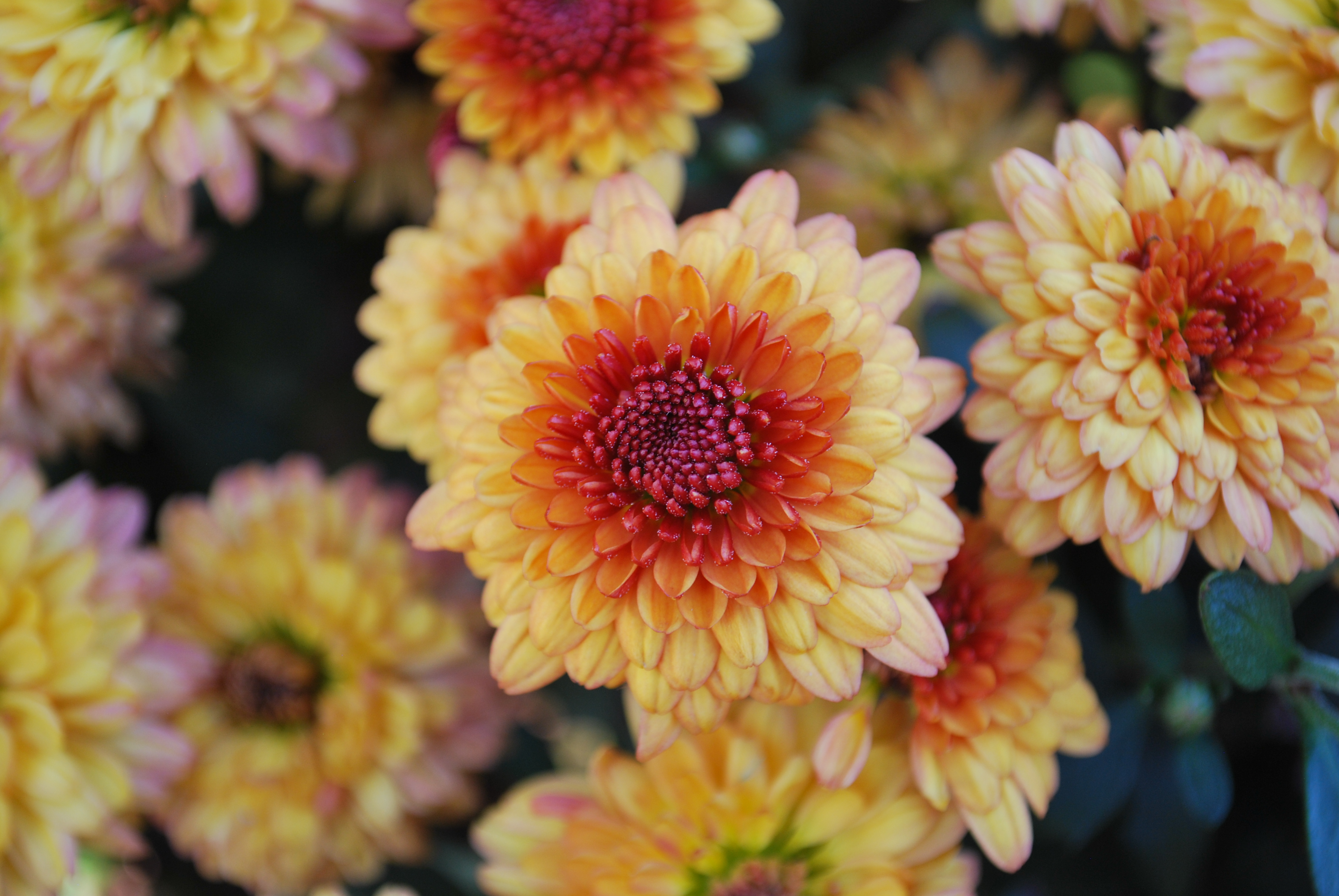
Tiger Tail chrysanthemum

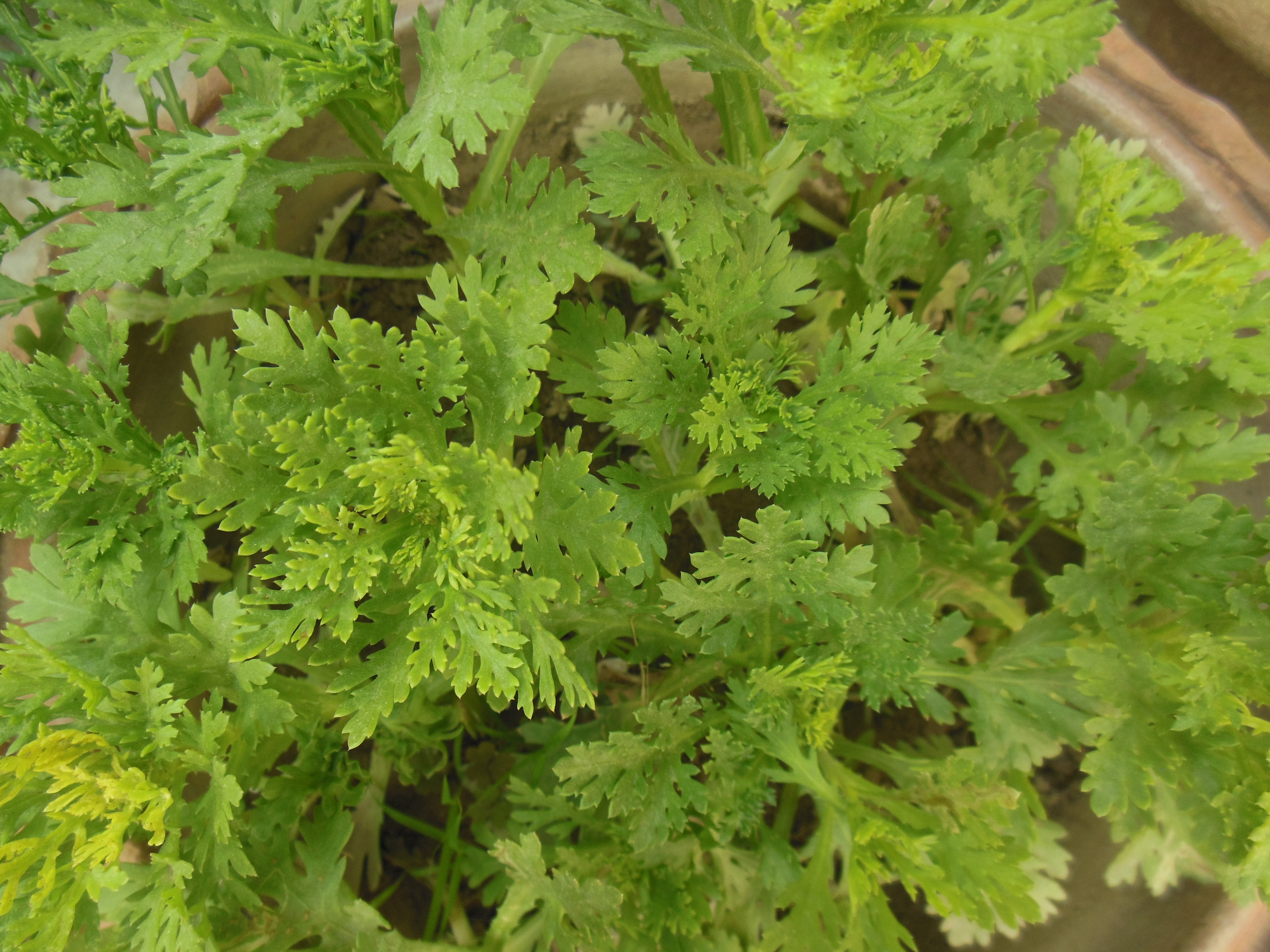
Leaves of chrysanthemum plant

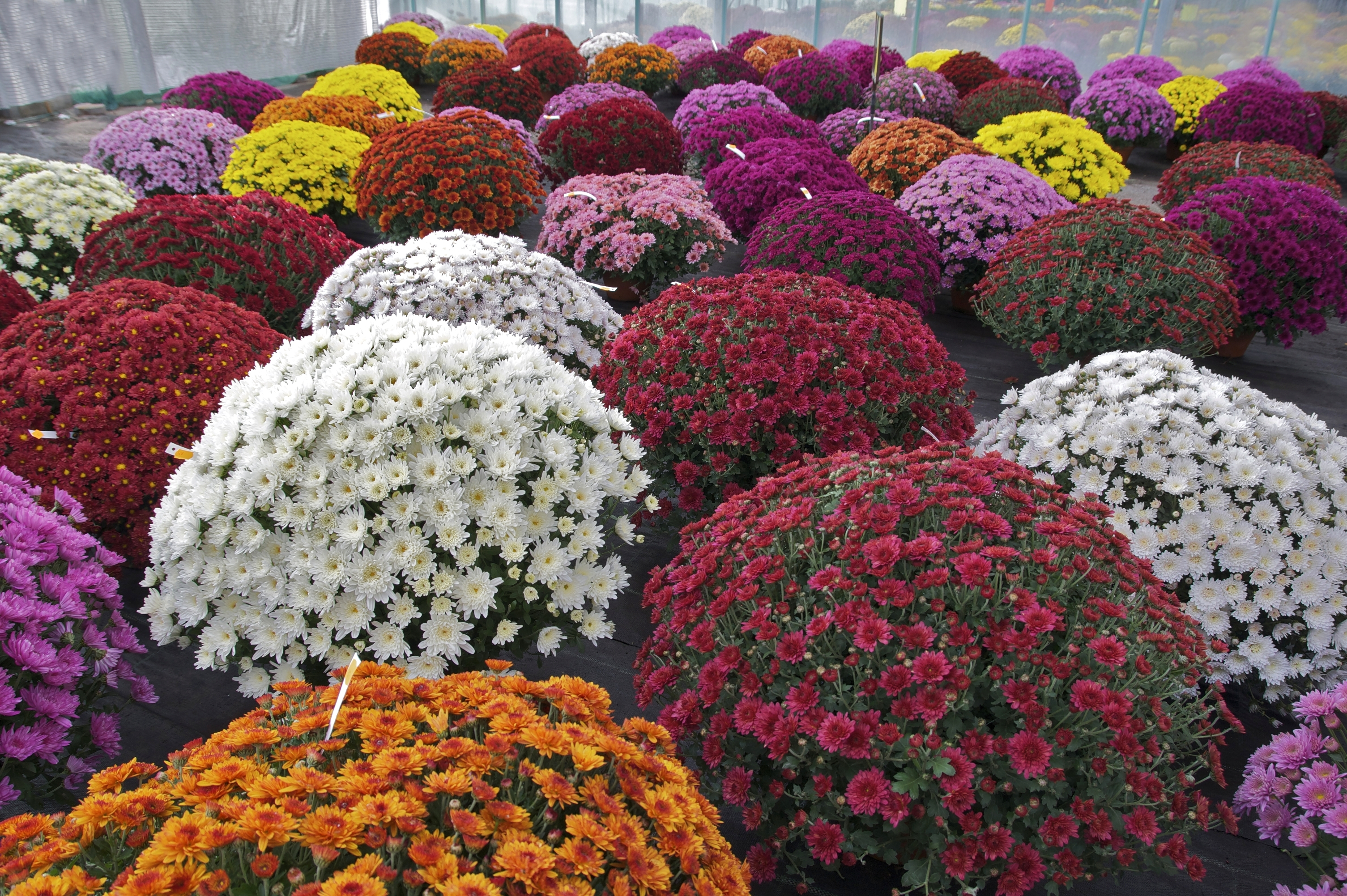
A chrysanthemum show

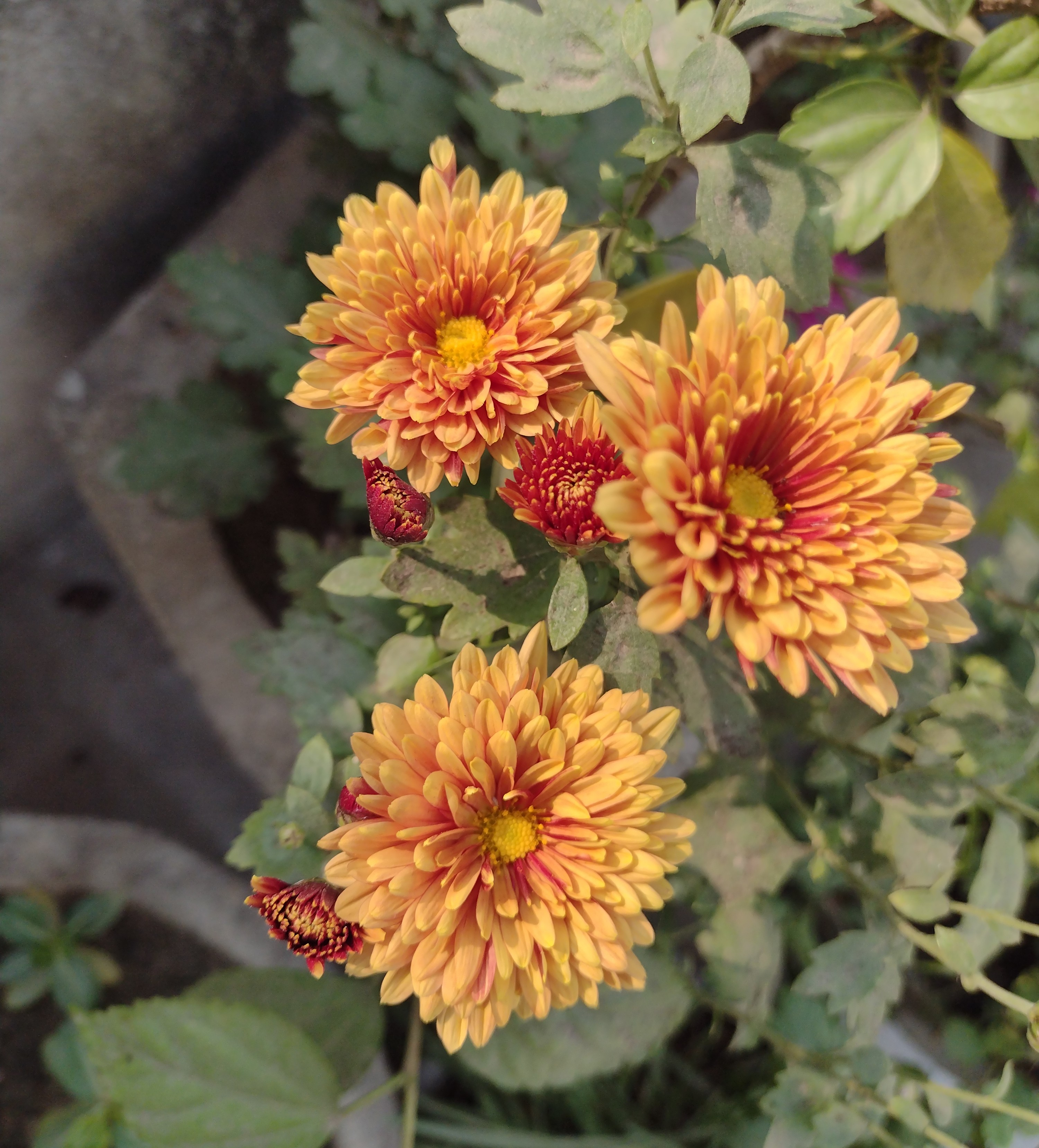
Yellow Chrysanthemum.

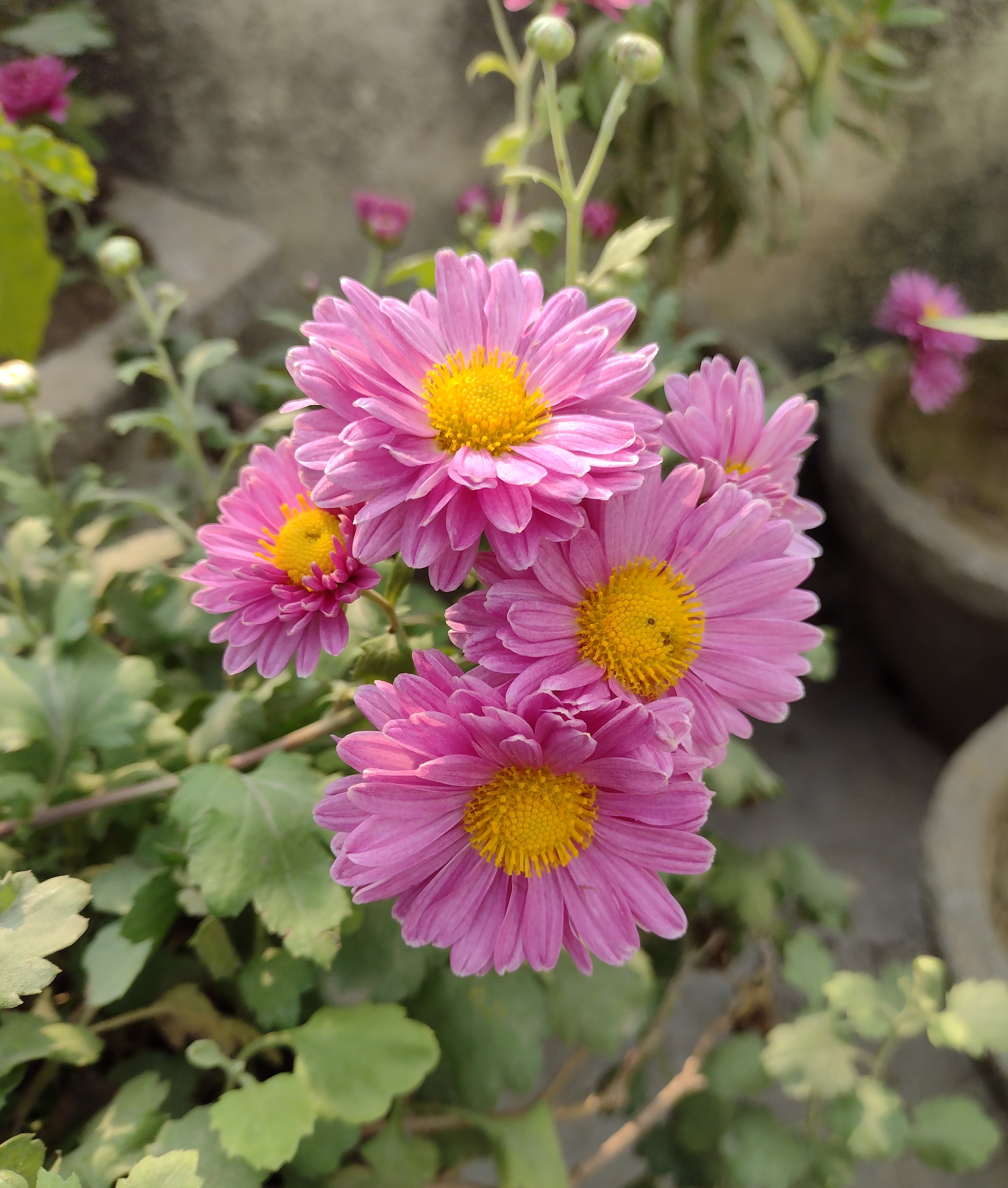
Purple Chrysanthemum

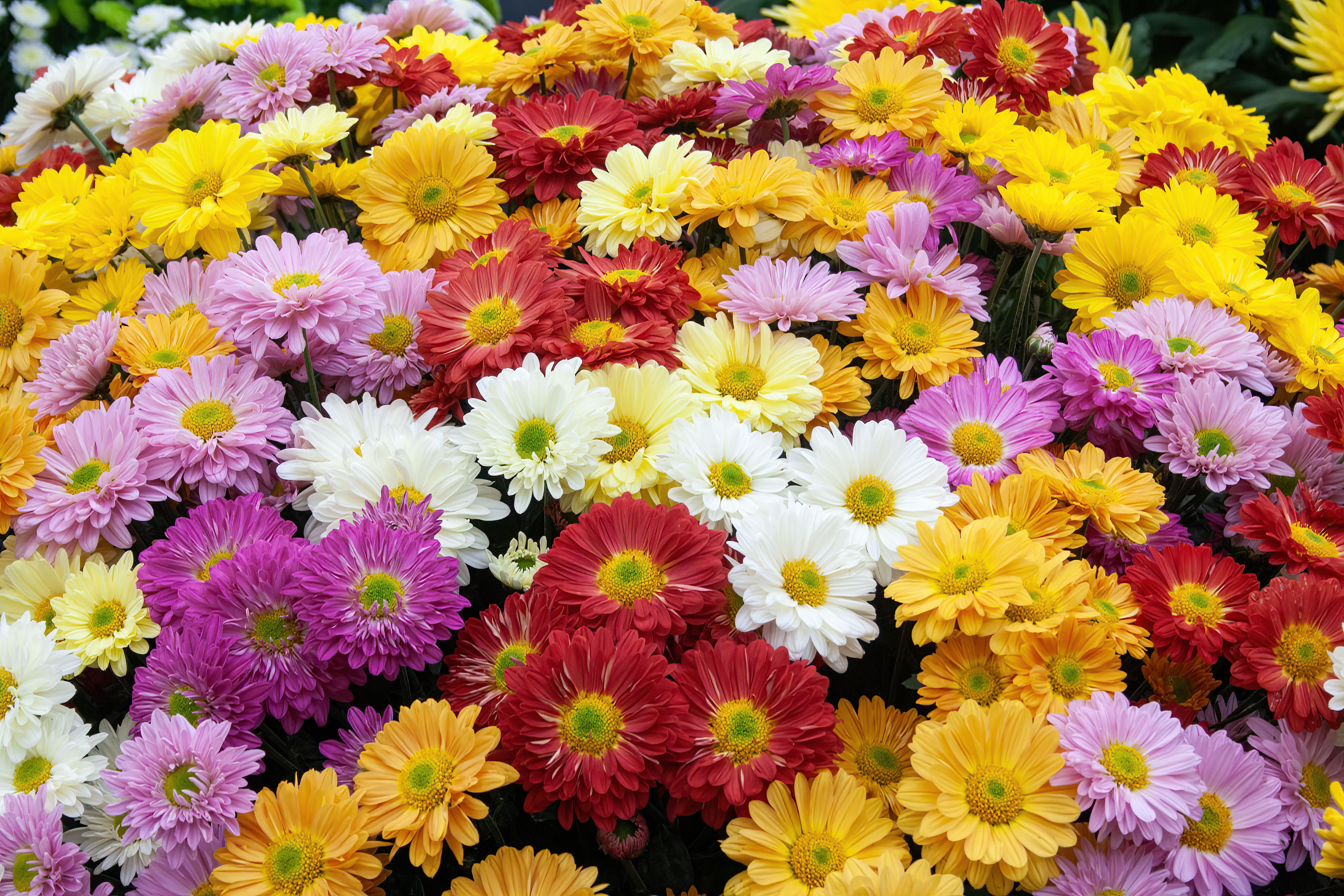
Chrysanthamums, mixed, part of a display at Hampton Court Flower Show.

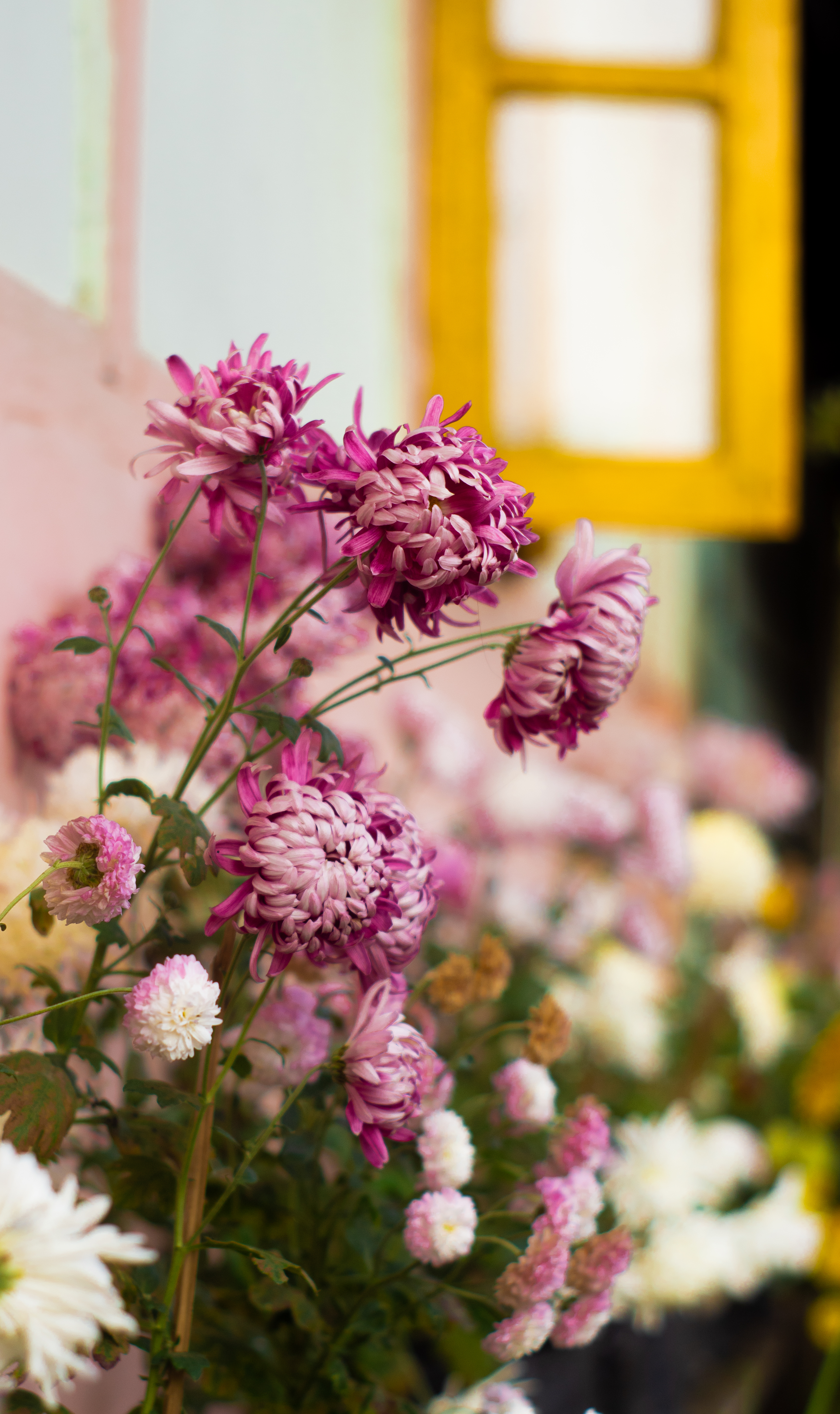
Garden in Kalimpong, India

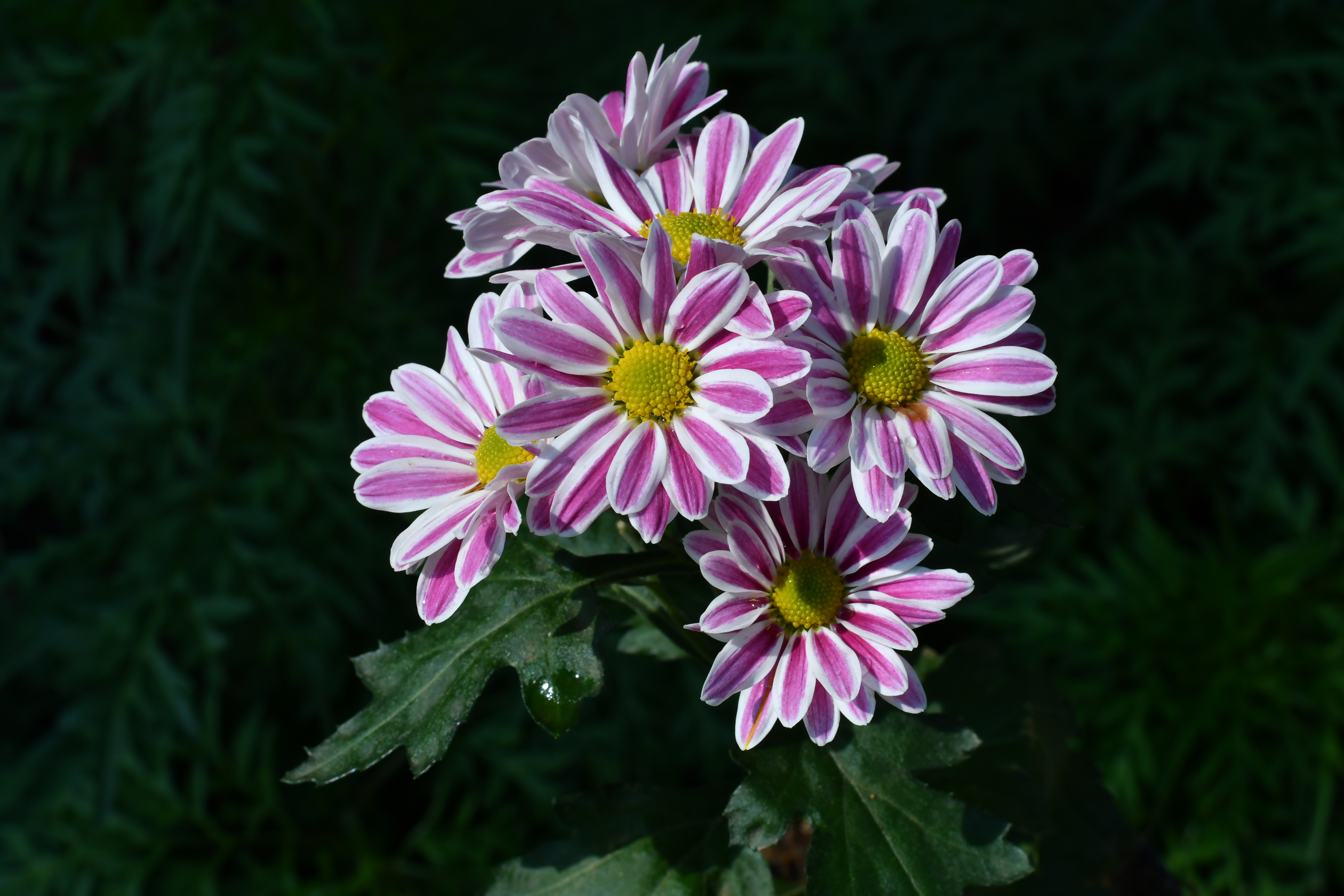
Chrysanthemum flowers, specifically a variety known for its bi-color blooms with striped pink and white petals. From Kerala, India

== See also ==
- Photoperiodism

== Bibliography ==
Books

- Bailey, L.H., ed. (1919) [1914]. "Chrysanthemum". The standard cyclopedia of horticulture; a discussion, for the amateur, and the professional and commercial grower, of the kinds, characteristics and methods of cultivation of the species of plants grown in the regions of the United States and Canada for ornament, for fancy, for fruit and for vegetables; with keys to the natural families and genera, descriptions of the horticultural capabilities of the states and provinces and dependent islands, and sketches of eminent horticulturists (6 vols.). Vol. 2 (3rd. ed.). New York: Macmillan. pp. 753–766. doi:10.5962/bhl.title.23351.
- Burbidge, Frederick William (1884). The Chrysanthemum: Its History, Culture, Classification, and Nomenclature. London: "The Garden" Office.
- Herrington, Arthur (November 2008) [1905 Orange Judd, New York]. The Chrysanthemum. Bedford MA: Applewood Books. ISBN 978-1-4290-1286-7.
- Joshi, Harshita (2019). Chrysanthemum and Marigold. Agrihortico.
- Oberprieler, C; Vogt, R; Watson, LE (2007). "Chrysanthemum". In Kadereit, Joachim W.; Jeffrey, Charles (eds.). Asterales. The Families and Genera of Vascular Plants, Klaus Kubitzki (ed.). Vol. VIII: Eudicots. Berlin: Springer-Verlag. p. 357. ISBN 978-3-540-31051-8.(see publisher information)
- Linnaeus, Carl (1753). "Chrysanthemum". Species Plantarum: exhibentes plantas rite cognitas, ad genera relatas, cum differentiis specificis, nominibus trivialibus, synonymis selectis, locis natalibus, secundum systema sexuale digestas. Vol. 2. Stockholm: Impensis Laurentii Salvii. pp. 887–890. doi:10.5962/bhl.title.669., see also Species Plantarum
- National Chrysanthemum Society (1978). Handbook on Chrysanthemum Classification: A Comprehensive List of Cultivars for the Natural Season Grower Including Available Source and Response.

Articles

- Carvalho, S. M. P.; Abi-Tarabay, H.; Heuvelink, E. (January 2005). "Temperature affects Chrysanthemum flower characteristics differently during three phases of the cultivation period". The Journal of Horticultural Science and Biotechnology. 80 (2): 209–216. Bibcode:2005JHSB...80..209C. doi:10.1080/14620316.2005.11511919. S2CID 86353882.
- Hao, Da-Cheng; Song, Yanjun; Xiao, Peigen; Zhong, Yi; Wu, Peiling; Xu, Lijia (11 August 2022). "The genus Chrysanthemum: Phylogeny, biodiversity, phytometabolites, and chemodiversity". Frontiers in Plant Science. 13 973197. Bibcode:2022FrPS...1373197H. doi:10.3389/fpls.2022.973197. PMC 9403765. PMID 36035721.
- Liu, Ping-Li; Wan, Qian; Guo, Yan-Ping; Yang, Ji; Rao, Guang-Yuan (1 November 2012). "Phylogeny of the Genus Chrysanthemum L.: Evidence from Single-Copy Nuclear Gene and Chloroplast DNA Sequences". PLOS One. 7 (11) e48970. Bibcode:2012PLoSO...748970L. doi:10.1371/journal.pone.0048970. PMC 3486802. PMID 23133665.
- Van Der Ploeg, A.; Heuvelink, E. (January 2006). "The influence of temperature on growth and development of chrysanthemum cultivars". The Journal of Horticultural Science and Biotechnology. 81 (2): 174–182. Bibcode:2006JHSB...81..174V. doi:10.1080/14620316.2006.11512047. S2CID 86403236.
- Shen, Chu-Ze; Zhang, Chu-Jie; Chen, Jie; Guo, Yan-Ping (26 May 2021). "Clarifying Recent Adaptive Diversification of the Chrysanthemum-Group on the Basis of an Updated Multilocus Phylogeny of Subtribe Artemisiinae (Asteraceae: Anthemideae)". Frontiers in Plant Science. 12 648026. Bibcode:2021FrPS...1248026S. doi:10.3389/fpls.2021.648026. PMC 8187803. PMID 34122473.

Websites

- NYBG (24 May 2024). "Chrysanthemum Classifications". Mertz Library - Research Guides - Plant & Gardening Help - Chrysanthemums.
