= Deadwood bonsai techniques =

Miniature tree cultivation techniques

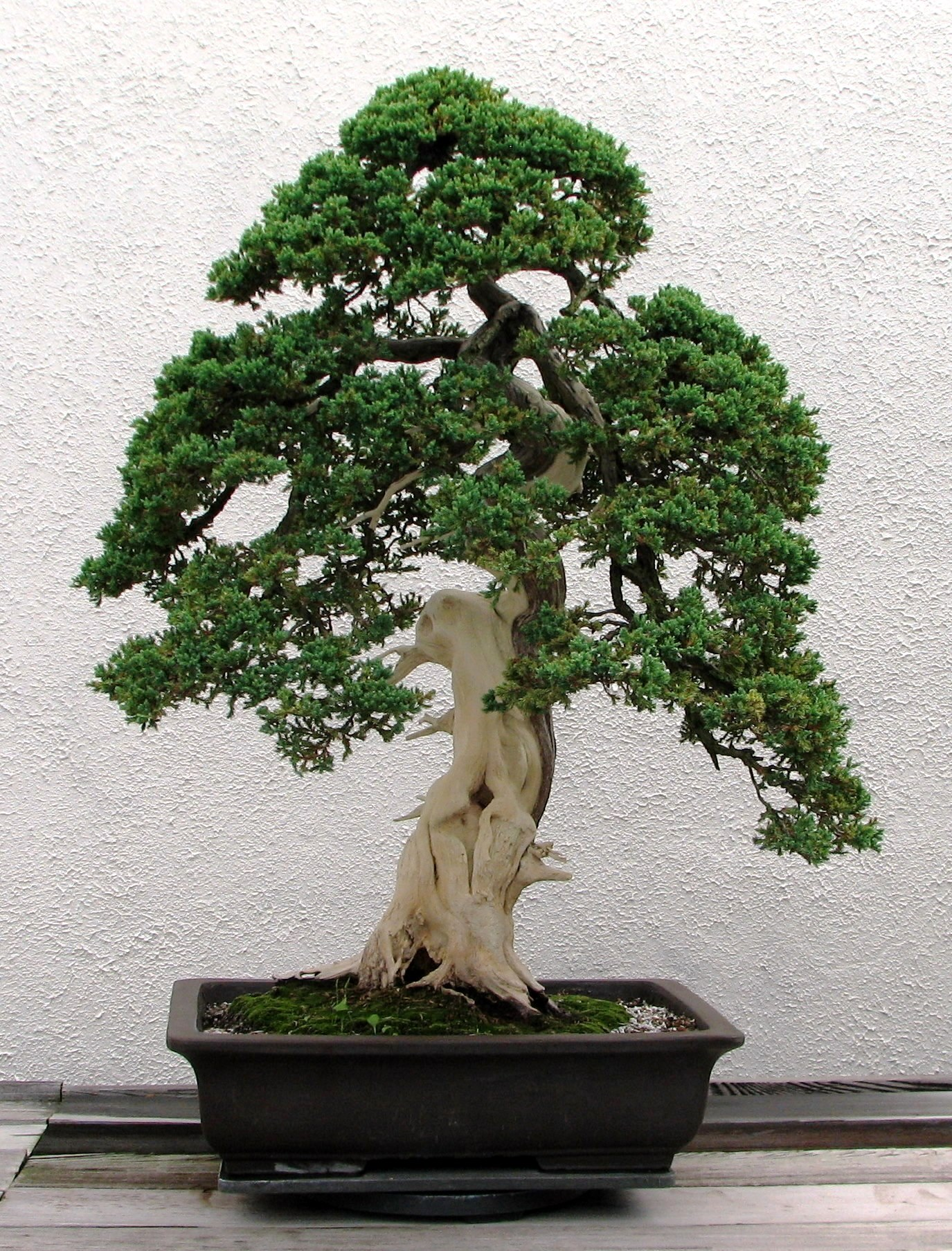
A Dwarf Japanese Juniper (Juniperus procumbens 'Nana') bonsai on display. Multiple deadwood styles have been used on this tree.

Deadwood bonsai techniques are methods in the Japanese art of bonsai (cultivation of miniature trees in containers) that create, shape, and preserve dead wood on a living bonsai tree. They enhance the illusion of age and the portrayal of austerity that mark a successful bonsai.

== Rationale and application ==
Deadwood techniques are used for reasons both practical and aesthetic. Practically, collected specimens (yamadori) of aged trees often have dead wood present. Dead wood can also appear on a bonsai under cultivation for many reasons, including branch die-back, pest infestation, or disease. It can be partially or completely removed by the bonsai artist, but doing so may damage the tree's overall shape or the illusion of age. If deadwood is retained, however, it must be chemically treated to preserve it and to produce the coloration of weathered wood. In addition, the dead wood usually needs to be shaped to fit the aesthetic plan for the bonsai.

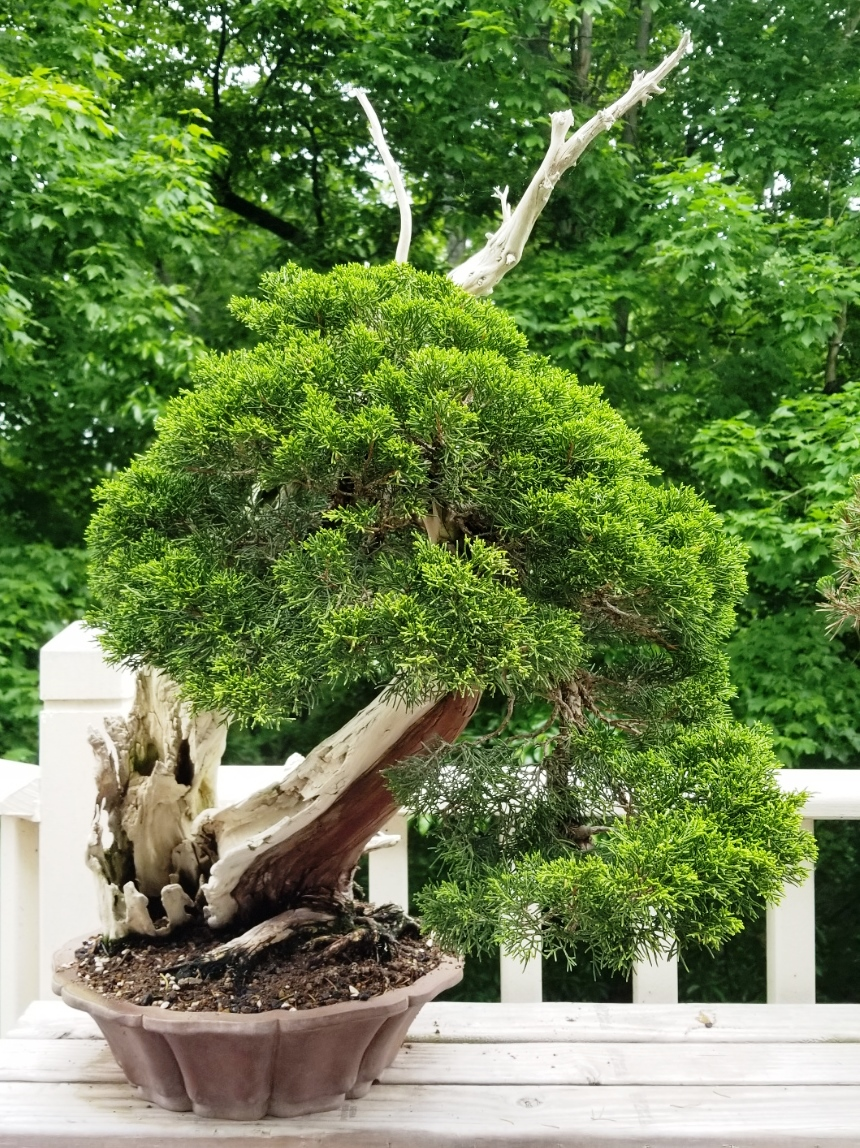
Deadwood is extensively used in this highly refined Western Juniper grafted with Juniperus chinensis var. 'Itoigawa' foliage. Notice the interplay of the live vein of the tree and its own deadwood, something the Japanese value as a reflection of life and death in nature. This tree is estimated to be 150-250 years old. The deadwood that rises above the apex is known as a tenjin.

Deadwood can also be an aesthetic choice for the grower. In bonsai being developed from trees free of dead wood, it may be aesthetically useful to create some deadwood elements to enhance the illusion of age, to hide defects (such as an overlarge or misplaced branch), or to disguise the original trunk after reducing the height of a tree that is too tall. Whether freely chosen, or forced on the bonsai designer, integrating deadwood into a tree's design is a necessity for a significant number of bonsai.

Usually, deadwood techniques for branches are applied to conifers. Deciduous trees tend to shed dead branches and heal over the wound, while conifers often retain the dead limb, which naturally becomes weathered and eroded over time. Most deadwood techniques for the tree's trunk apply equally well to deciduous and to conifer bonsai, although the driftwood style (in which much of the trunk is dead) is generally restricted to conifers.

== Deadwood techniques ==
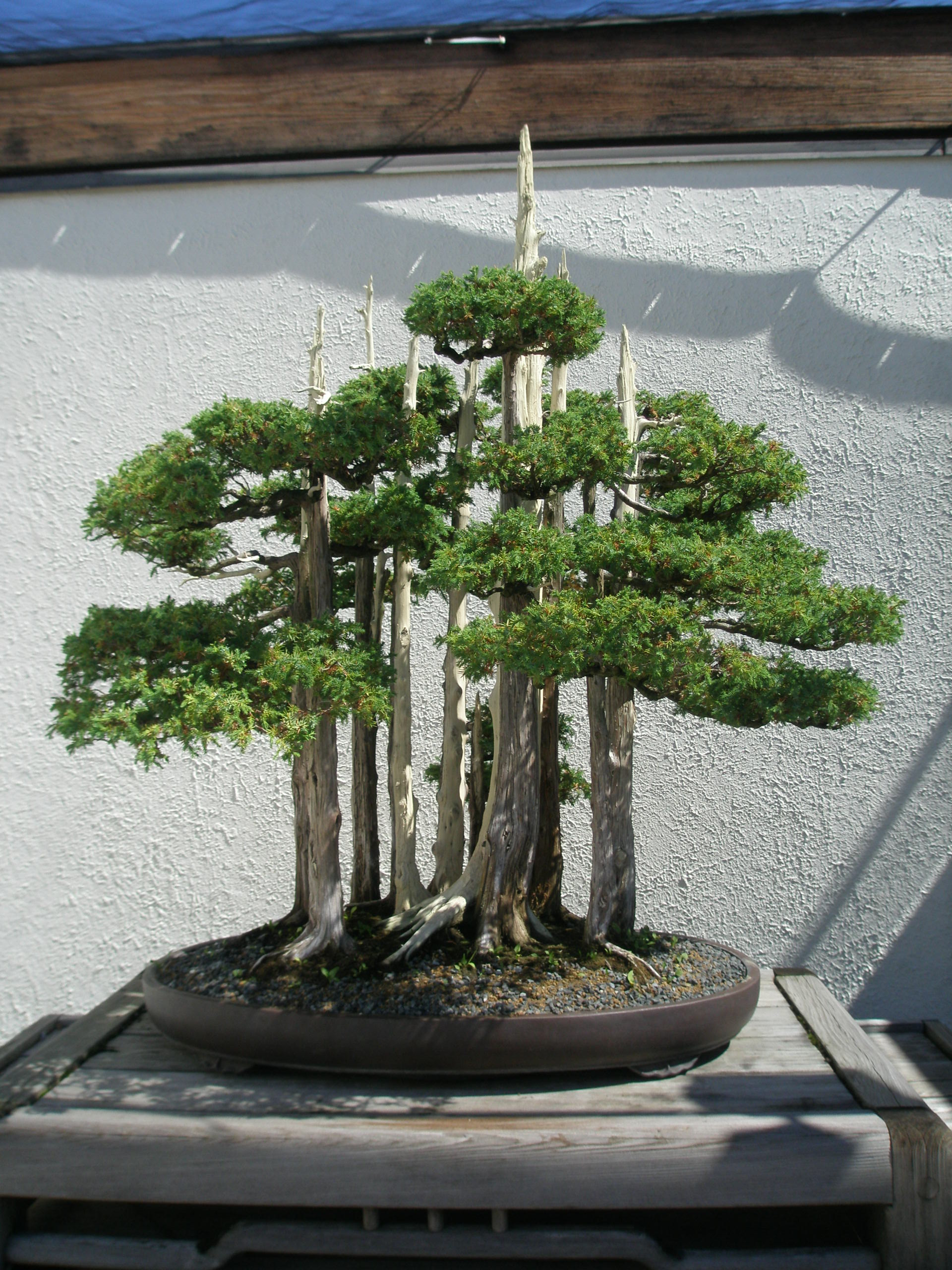
John Naka's masterpiece, Goshin, is on display at the United States National Arboretum. There are top jin on the leaders of several trees in this group planting.

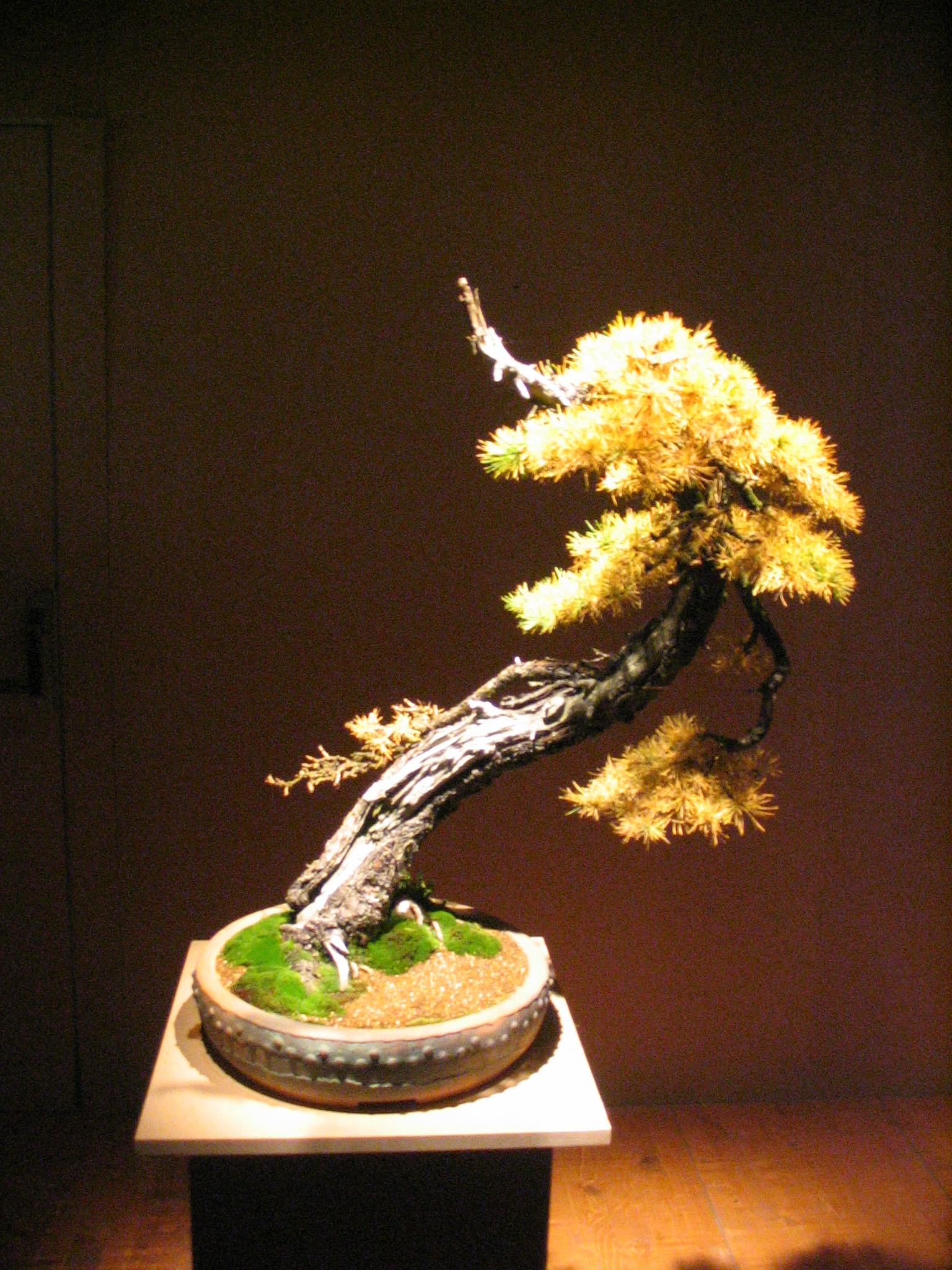
A jin can be seen on the top left of this larch, and a shari runs up the front of the trunk from the roots on the left.

=== Jin ===
Jin (神) is a bonsai deadwood technique used on branches or the top of the trunk (the "leader"). A jin is meant to show age, or show that the tree has had a struggle to survive. Jins are created in nature when wind, lightning, or other adversity kills the leader or a branch further down the tree. A jin requires the complete removal of bark from a given start point to the end of the branch or leader. The remaining wood dies and dries out to form the jin.

Creating a jin from the leader (a "top jin") can produce a shorter, more visibly tapered bonsai in a single step. The change in proportion can greatly improve the illusion of age in the bonsai specimen. Removing the active leader distributes vigor to lower branches, which will grow more quickly and help increase trunk diameter, reinforcing the illusion of age. A top jin also provides an aesthetic solution for a tree with two leaders, an unaesthetic shape that the designer can modify by turning one of the two into a jin.

When used on branches, the jin technique allows the grower to remove some of a bonsai's unwanted branches while increasing the illusion of age. A remaining jin may be long, with a pleasing shape bent or carved into it, or short, like the dead remains of a branch broken off near the trunk.

=== Uro ===
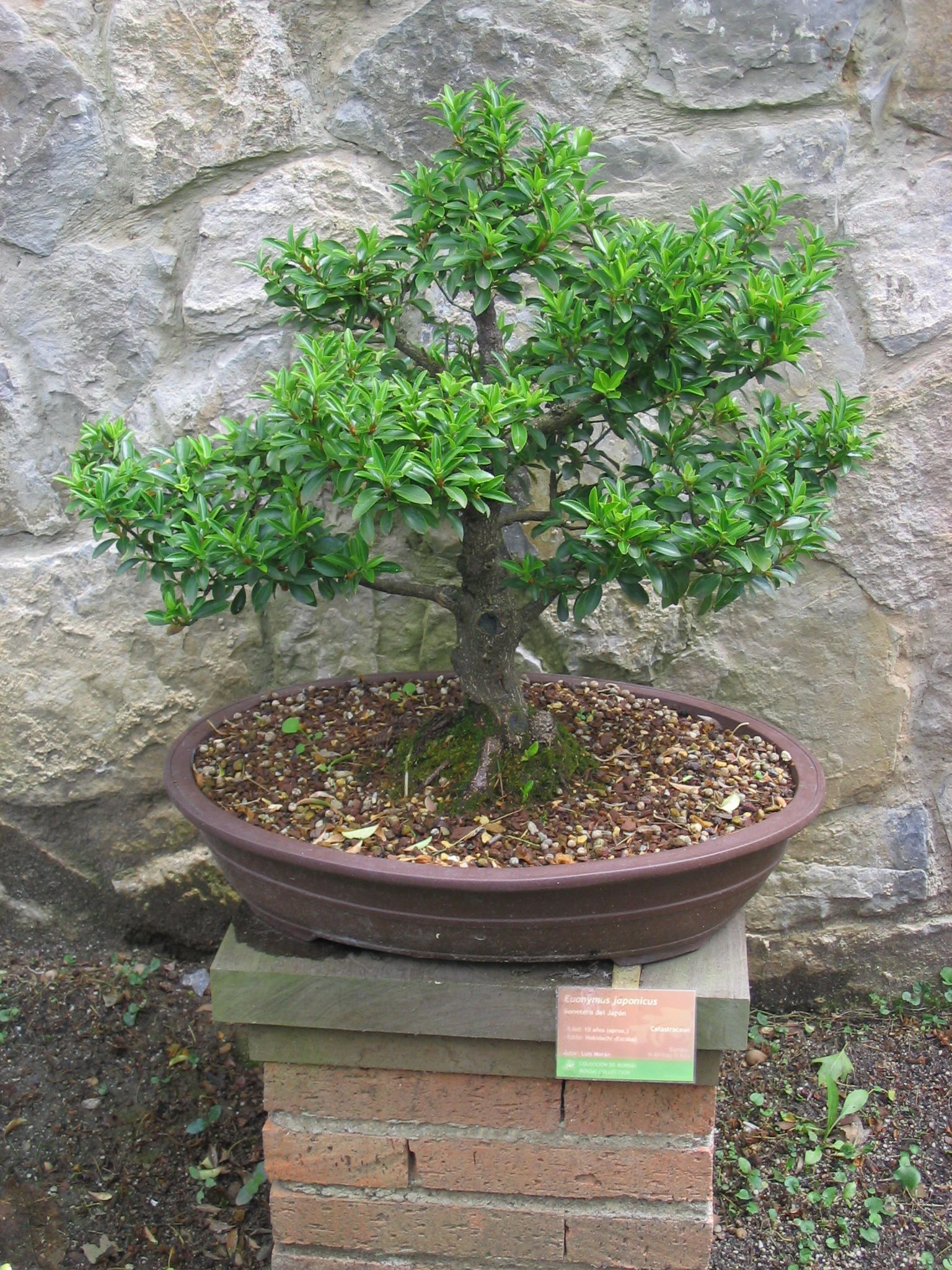
A uro can be seen close to the bottom of the trunk of this bonsai.

While jin appear natural on coniferous bonsai, they do not look as appropriate on most deciduous and broadleaf species. In these species, dead branches generally rot and fall off the tree. A small indentation is left where the branch used to be, and new wood grows around it forming a small hollow. Bonsai gardeners replicate this hollow as a uro by making a small, irregularly-shaped wound in the trunk . For example, when removing a branch from a deciduous or broadleaf species, bonsai growers often make a uro to avoid having an ugly wound healing slowly and scarring without control.

=== Shari and driftwood styles ===
A shari is deadwood on the main trunk of the bonsai. A small shari usually runs vertically on or near the front of the trunk - shari have little aesthetic value at the rear of the trunk, where they are rarely viewed and are obscured by branch growth. The shallow wound exposes a non-living portion of the trunk, which will be surrounded by living bark. The natural causes of shari include a falling branch that has ripped bark from the trunk below it, lightning damage, or trunk damage from another external source. Shari may occur naturally on a bonsai, or may be created by carving the bark.

If the amount of dead trunk (and possibly dead branches situated on the dead trunk area) is large enough, the bonsai is said to be in the sharimiki ( 舎利幹) or driftwood style, because a large portion of the tree has the silvery, weathered look of driftwood on a beach, or ancient tree remnants on a harsh mountain landscape. "Veins" or "lifelines" of living bark connect the roots to the live branches, but large amounts of the surrounding wood are dead, free of bark, and weathered. The dead wood may be carved into arresting shapes, to look like severely weatherbeaten tree remnants. The unusual combination of large dead areas contrasting with small signs of life is compelling regardless of the basic shape of the tree, and driftwood-style trees often do not follow the conventional bonsai styles.

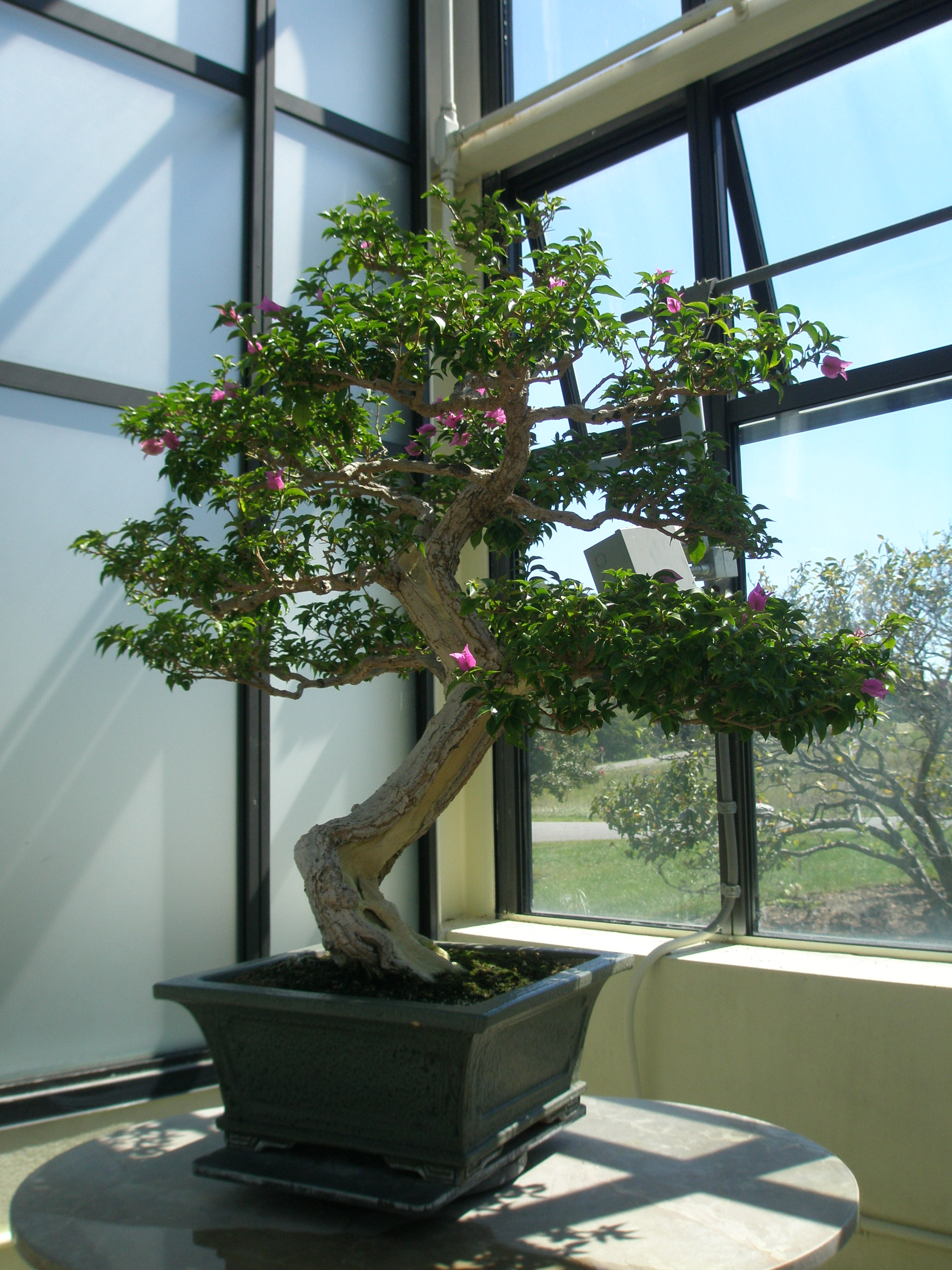
Bougainvillea bonsai at the United States National Arboretum. A large sabamiki is at the bottom right of the tree

=== Sabamiki ===
Sabamiki means "hollowed trunk" or "split trunk". It gives the visual effect of a lightning strike or other severe and deep trunk damage, which has been weathered over time. Sabamiki is done by stripping bark from the trunk, then drilling or carving out the exposed wood to produce a deep wound. The hollowed area may start and end part-way up the trunk, or it may start with a wide opening at the base of the tree which tapers to closure partway up the trunk. The wound must not completely interrupt the flow of nutrients in the tree, or the branches above it will die. When the shaping work is complete, the exposed wood is treated with a preservative. In rare cases the trunk may be split open, rather than hollowed out, in order to correct reverse taper.

=== Tanuki ===
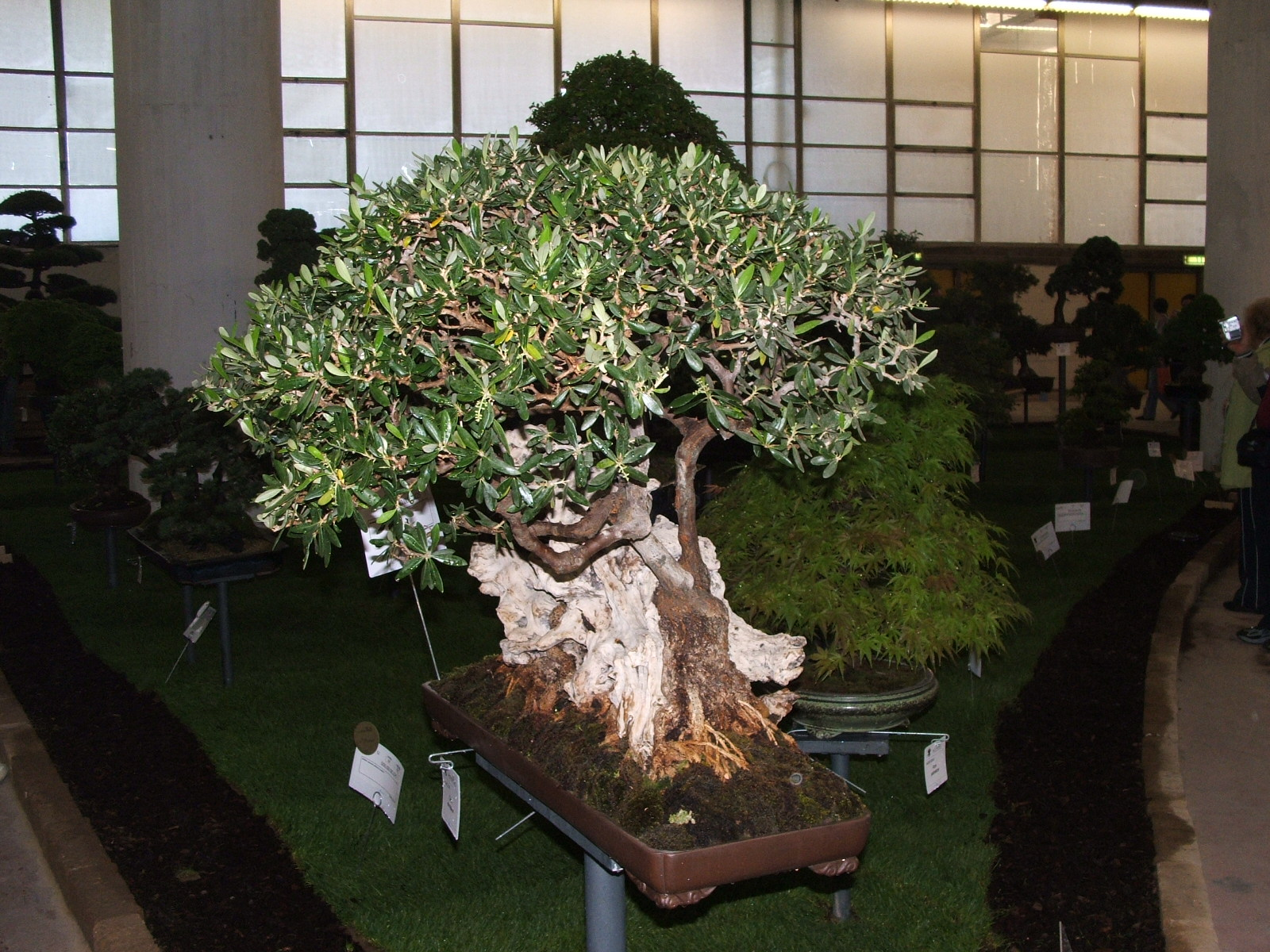
A Tanuki-style tree at a bonsai show.

In tanuki bonsai, a living tree is joined to an interesting piece of deadwood to create a composite in the driftwood style. The deadwood usually has the form of a weathered tree trunk, or at least its lower portion. To add living material to the deadwood, a groove or channel is first carved into it. The living tree (usually a young juniper, because of the species' vigor, flexibility, and ability to endure harsh shaping) is fixed within the channel using non-reactive nails or screws, wire wrappings, or clamps. Over time, the young tree grows into the deadwood channel, which disguises the fact that it is a separate entity. Once firmly in place, the nails, screws, or other affixing devices are removed, and the living tree is cultivated and shaped with typical bonsai techniques.

Real driftwood-style bonsai are usually not grown from the common bonsai source materials, but instead are specimens taken from the wild, and are prized but very rare. The tanuki process makes it possible to generate a driftwood-style product from much more common materials. Whether that product can be considered a traditional bonsai is open to question, as implied by the Japanese name for this technique. In Japanese folklore, tanuki (狸; alternatively タヌキ), are shape-changing tricksters inspired by the Japanese raccoon dog. Tanuki bonsai are sometimes known by the term "Phoenix Grafts" in the West, and many bonsai growers outside Japan consider tanuki an acceptable bonsai technique. But this technique is not currently an accepted part of the Japanese bonsai tradition, and tanuki would not be displayed at a formal Japanese bonsai show.

== Tools and techniques ==
Many standard shop and woodworking tools may be used in the process of creating or maintaining deadwood on bonsai. Pliers are used to grip and break off branches for jin, and are also useful for ripping off strips of bark for jin or shari. Manual tools like graving chisels, burins, and blades can carve detail into the surface of the jins or shari, since real or simulated wood grain is an important characteristic of deadwood on a bonsai. Recent years have seen bonsai practitioners adopt powered tools for deadwood work, particularly small rotary tools for carving and grinding. When shaping is completed, a gas torch burns off remaining small shreds of wood fiber and helps raise the grain in a newly exposed piece of wood. Finally, wire brushes and sanding aids remove tool marks and simulate weathering.

Once deadwood has been shaped to the designer's plan, the exposed area is treated with a bleaching preservative. The most common is a horticultural combination of lime and sulfur, available from many garden outlets. The preservative protects the wood from rot and pest infestation, and provides a uniform bleaching that resembles weathered, aged wood.

== See also ==
- Bonsai
- Bonsai cultivation and care
- Bonsai aesthetics
- Bonsai styles
- Chrysanthemum bonsai
- Penjing
