= Nebari =

Nebari may refer to:

- In bonsai aesthetics, the surface roots flaring from the base of a tree
- The fictional Nebari alien race from the Farscape universe
