= Walter Pall =

Austrian bonsai artist (born 1944)

- Born: 1944 (age 80–81); Austria
- Known for: Bonsai
- Spouse: Hannah Pall (m. 1968)
- Awards: Crespi Cup Award, Gingko Bonsai Award
- Website: www.walter-pall.de

Walter Pall (born 1944) is a bonsai artist. Born in Austria, he now lives near Munich, Germany. He is considered one of the foremost bonsai artists in the West, and perhaps the world.

== Life ==
Pall was born in Austria in 1944 and grew up in the Alps, where he loves to ski. He married his wife, Hannah, in 1968; they have one son. They now live near Munich, Germany.

Pall worked as a top manager in the electronics and consulting industry, but took up bonsai as a hobby in 1980. In 1990, he left his job to become a part-time bonsai professional. Pall is particularly known for his workshops and lectures, which he gives at conventions around the world. Despite his respect and prestige in the bonsai world, however, Pall considers himself an amateur and does not aim for commercial success; rather, he styles trees and maintains his garden for his own enjoyment.

== Bonsai ==
Pall is known for his naturalistic style, which deviates from traditional practices of bonsai development. One method used to achieve this style is his signature "hedge cutting method," in which a tree is left to grow and then cut back aggressively, resulting in fine ramification.

He was also one of the first bonsai artists to use native European species, and is known for his use of native European material for yamadori. (Note: Japanese: 山採り, lit. 'taken from the mountains', referring to bonsai trees collected in the wild) One such species is the oriental hornbeam, which Pall sources from Croatia.

Though many of his most famous trees are fairly large (one of the most famous bonsai in Europe is a large Japanese maple Pall developed), he also has a sizeable collection of shohin. (Note: Japanese: 小品, lit. 'small thing', a category of small bonsai)

Pall has received many awards, including first place in the Crespi Cup Award and second and third place in the Ginkgo Cup Awards.

== Writing ==
Pall has written over 100 articles in various bonsai magazines, such as Bonsai Focus. He has also long been active in the online bonsai community, participating in various forums.
