= Bonsai styles =

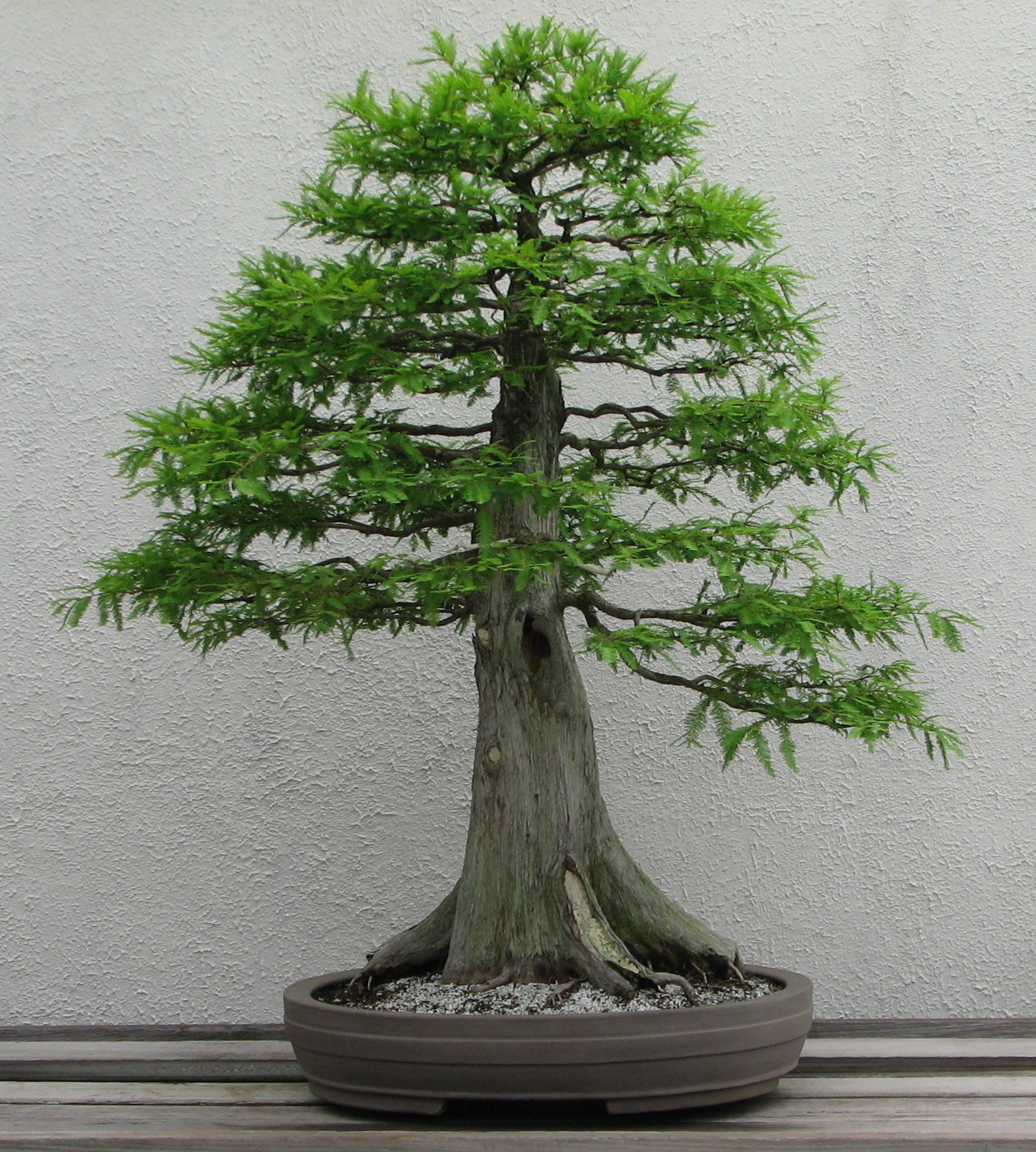
Formal upright style Bald cypress

Bonsai is a Japanese art form using miniature trees grown in containers. Similar practices exist in other cultures, including the Chinese tradition of penjing from which the art originated, and the miniature living landscapes of Vietnamese hòn non bộ, but this article describes the Japanese tradition.

The Japanese art of bonsai dates back over a thousand years, and has evolved its own unique aesthetics and terminology. A key design practice in bonsai is a set of commonly understood, named styles that describe canonical tree and setting designs. These well-known styles provide a convenient shorthand means for communicating about existing bonsai and for designing new ones.

== Concept of styles ==
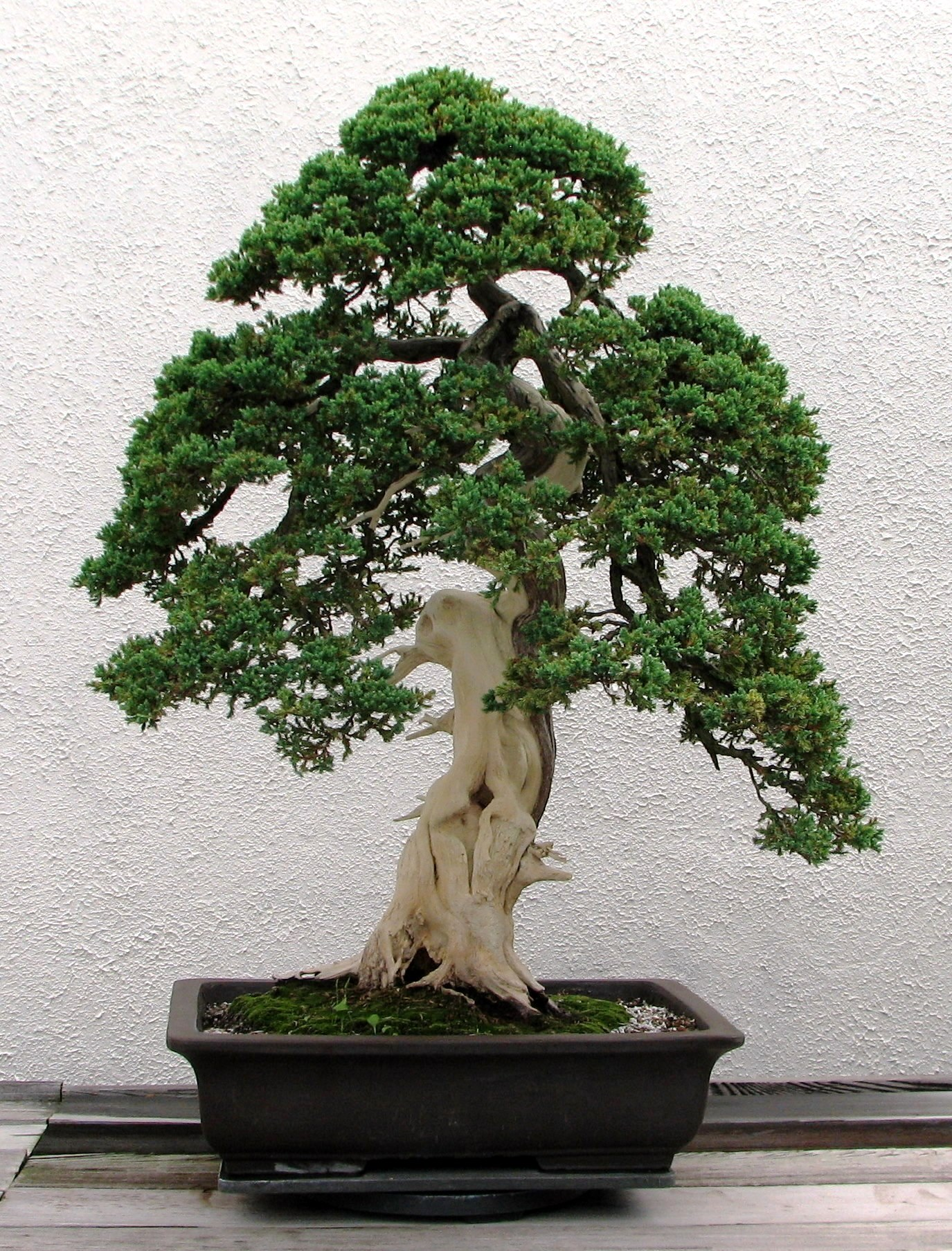
Informal upright style Juniper

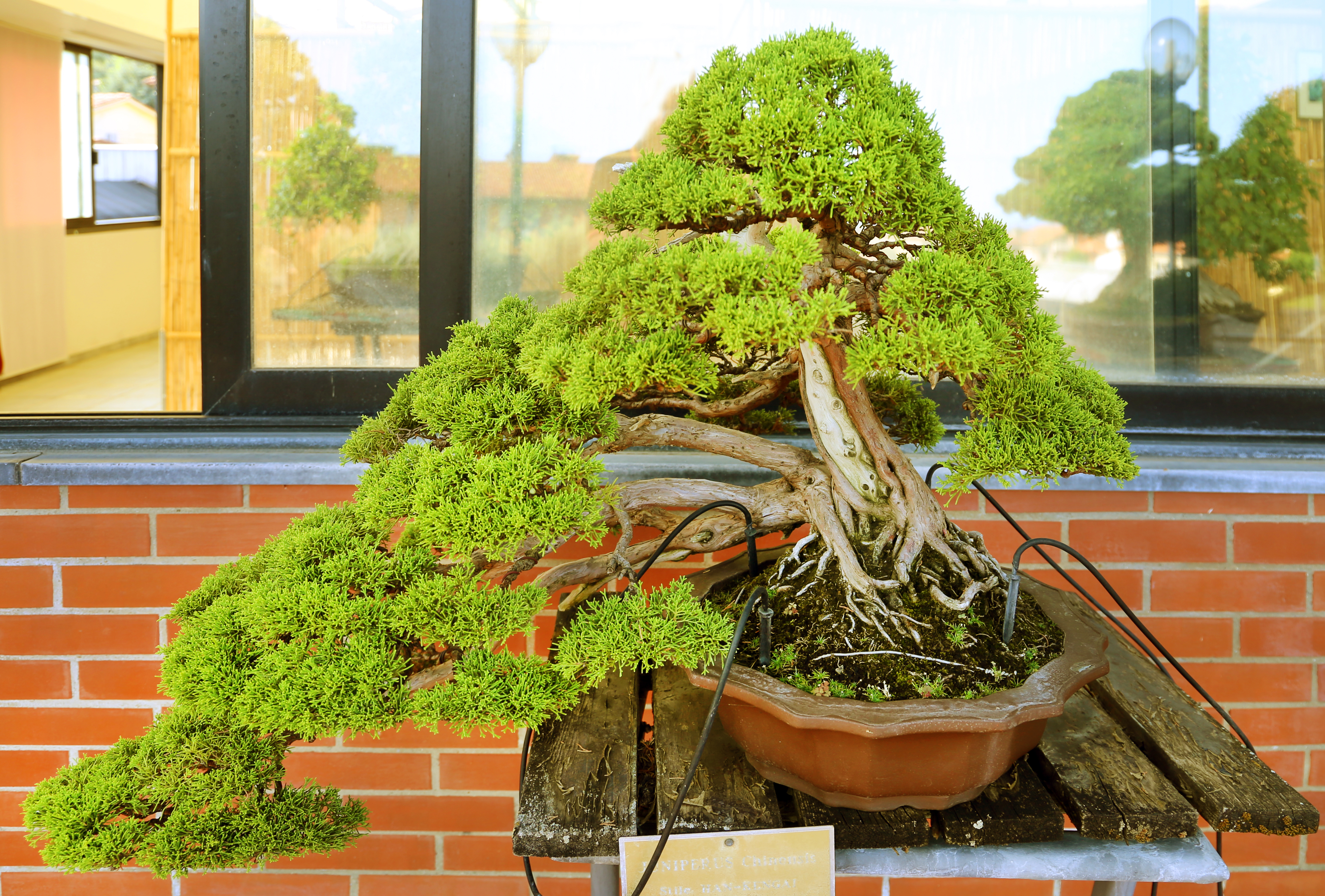
Semi-cascade style Juniperus chinensis

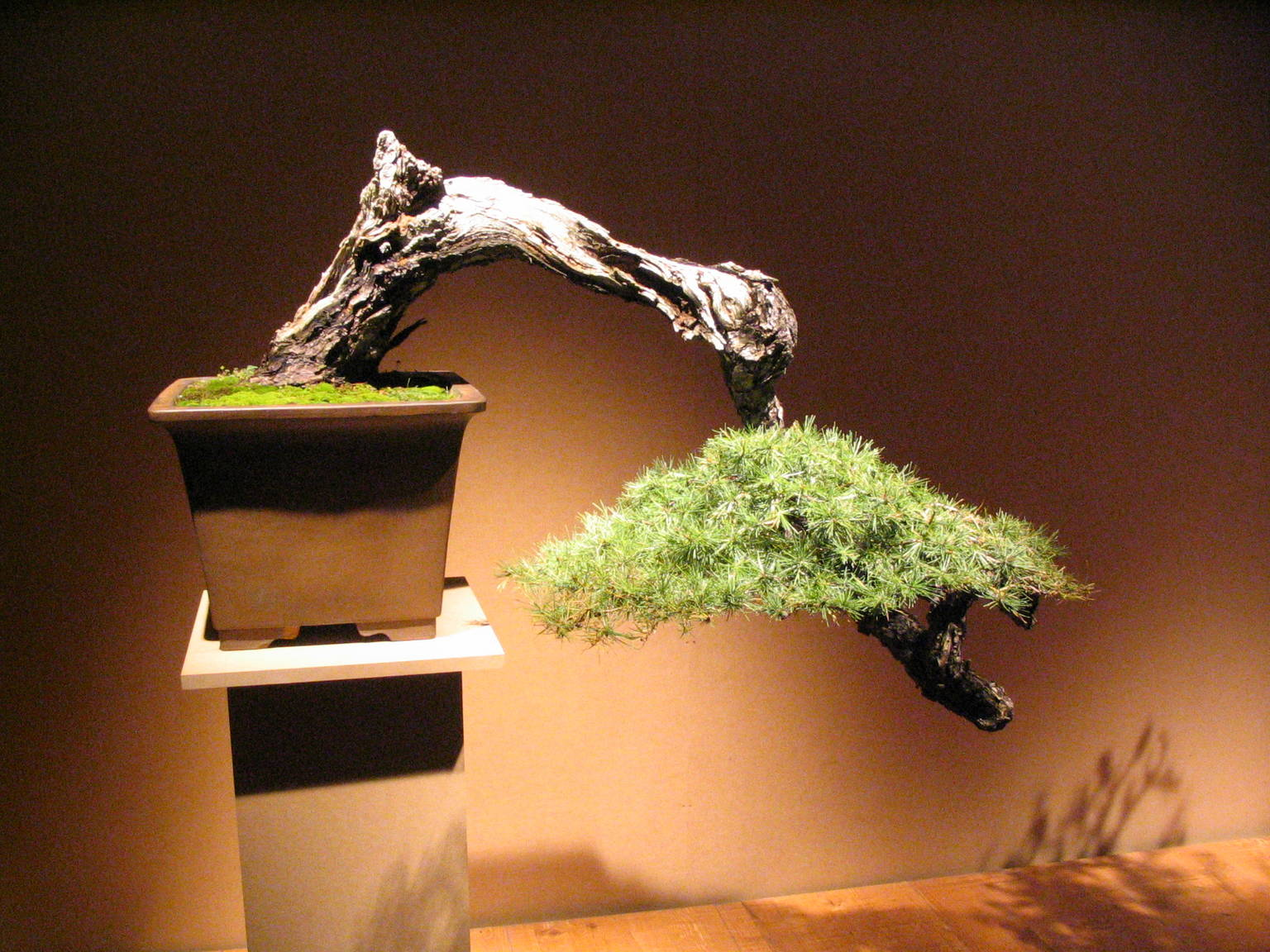
Cascade style conifer

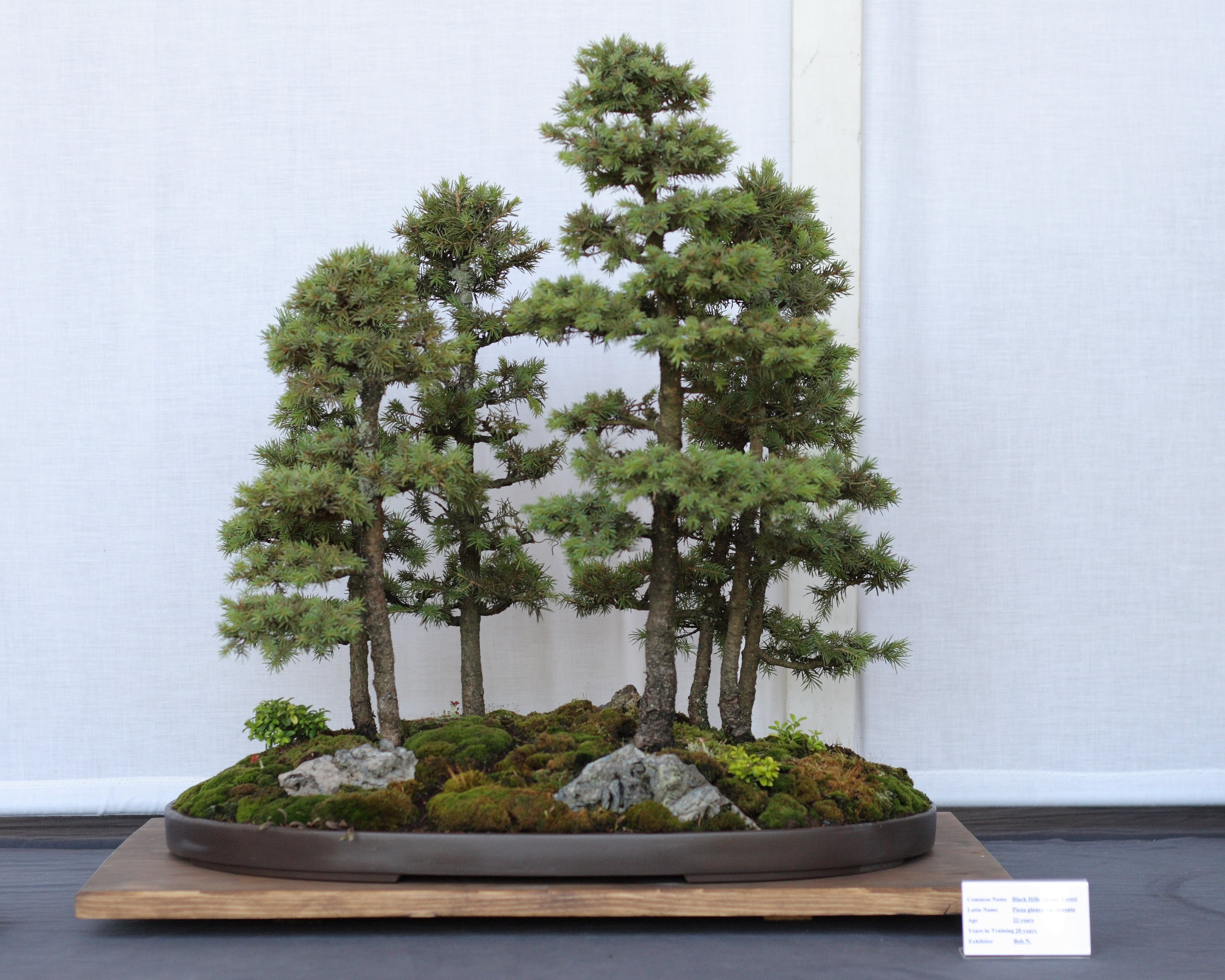
Forest style Black Hills Spruce

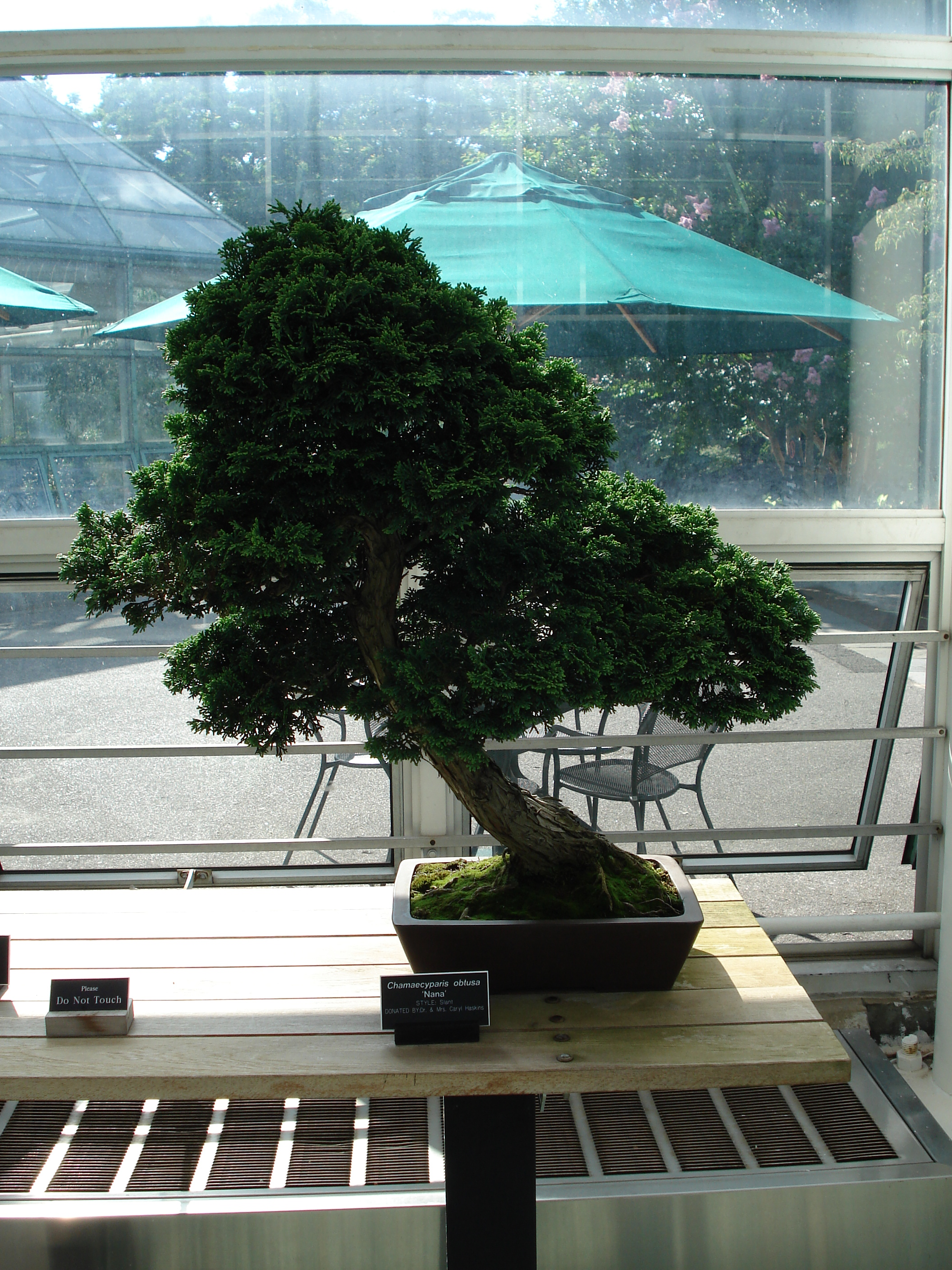
Slant style Hinoki cypress

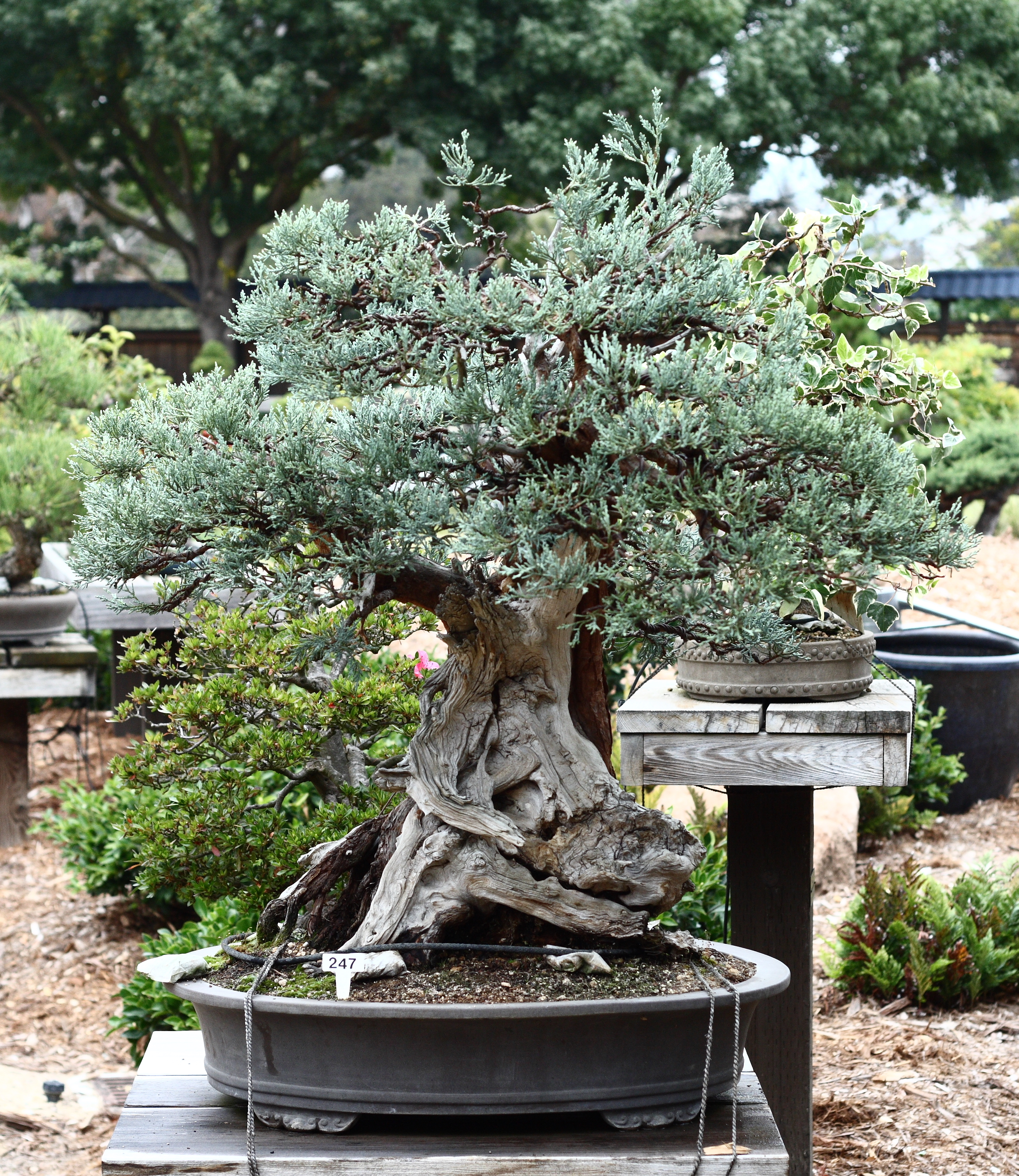
Driftwood style Sierra juniper (Juniperus occidentalis var. australis)

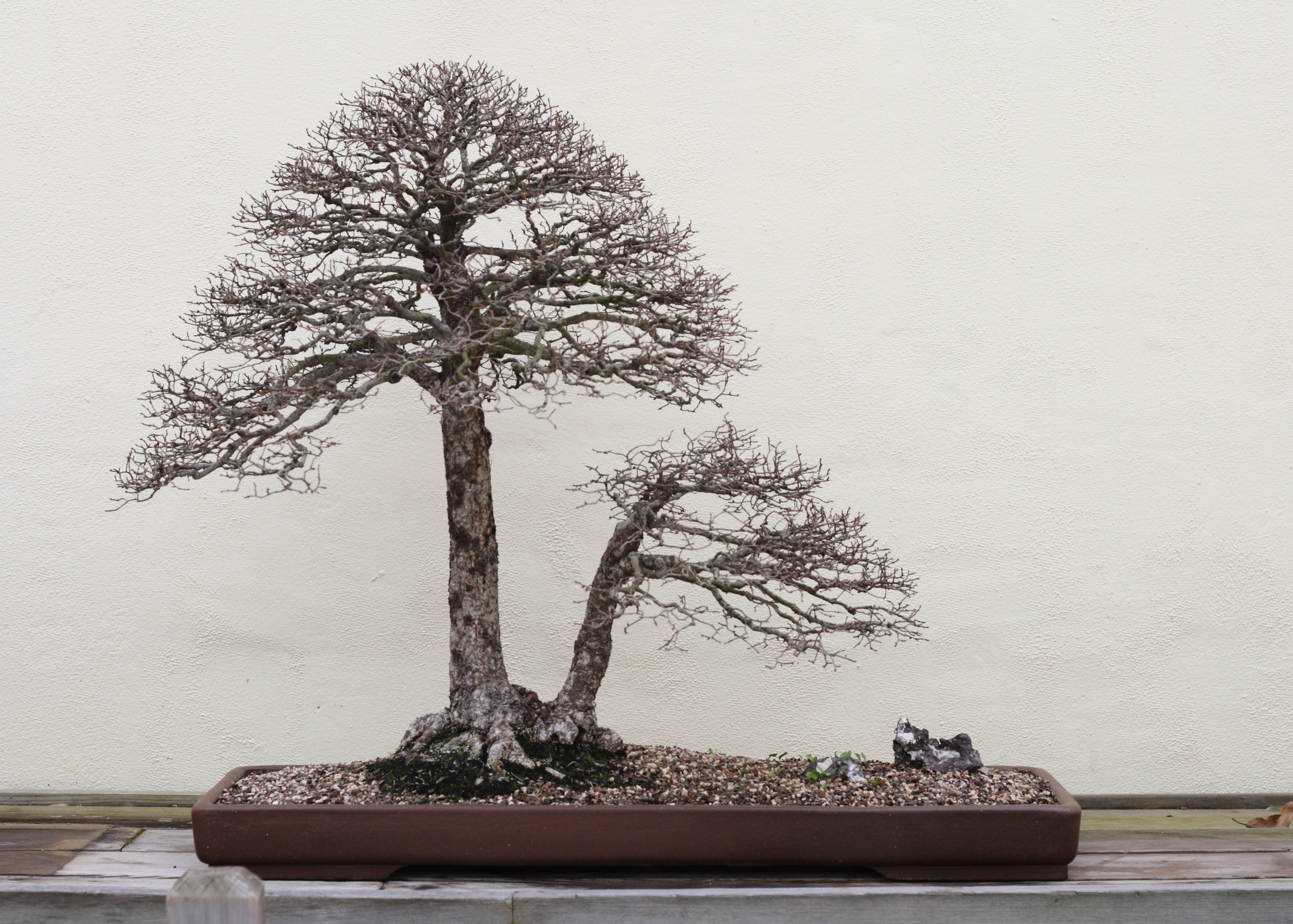
Twin-trunk style smoothleaf elm (Ulmus minor)

Styles can be grouped based on different criteria, such as the trunk orientation or the number of trunks in the bonsai specimen. Some of the major style groupings include:

- Trunk orientation. A frequently used set of styles describe the orientation of the bonsai tree's main trunk. Different terms are used for a tree with its apex directly over the center of the trunk's entry into the soil (these are the upright styles, including chokkan and moyogi), slightly to the side of that center (e.g., sho-shakan), deeply inclined to one side (e.g., chu-shakan and dai-shakan), and inclined below the point at which the trunk of the bonsai enters the soil (the cascade or kengai styles).
- Trunk and bark surface. A number of styles describe the trunk shape and bark finish. For example, a bonsai with a twisted trunk is nebikan (also nejikan (ねじ幹)), and one with a vertical split or hollows is sabakan. The deadwood bonsai styles identify trees with prominent dead branches or trunk scarring.
- Trunk and root placement. Although most bonsai trees are planted directly into the soil, there are styles describing trees planted on rock. For example, the root-over rock style is deshojo (出猩々), and the style in which trees are rooted wholly within (atop or on the sides of) a large rock is ishizuki.
- Multiple trunks. While the majority of bonsai specimens feature a single tree, there are well-established style categories for specimens with multiple trunks. Within these styles, a bonsai can be classified by number of trunks alone (e.g., sokan for a double trunk from a single root, soju for two separate trees, sambon-yose for three trees, and so on). The configuration of the trunks can also be described by specific styles, including raft (ikadabuji or ikadabuki) and sinuous (netsunagari) styles for multiple trees growing from a connected root, and the general term yose-ue for multiple unconnected trees in large number.

These terms are not mutually exclusive, and a single bonsai specimen can exhibit more than one style characteristic. When a bonsai specimen falls into multiple style categories, the common practice is to describe it by the dominant or most striking characteristic. For example, an informal upright tree with prominent areas of missing bark and trunk scarring will be described as a sharimiki rather than a moyogi.

=== Purposes ===
The system of styles serves many purposes, some practical, some aesthetic. In their simplest and most common application, styles provide a form of shorthand description for bonsai specimens. The brief style term appears in catalog descriptions, usually with a species identifier, and thereby compactly describes the subject bonsai. Style names can also be used to group comparable specimens in bonsai viewing and competition. Even considering the styles simply as descriptive labels, the system still simplifies bonsai teaching and learning, and provides widely understood terms for public communications about bonsai.

Predefined styles also aid the designer in making a development plan for a pre-bonsai tree. The untrained specimen may have characteristics that suggest or rule out certain styles. For example, a crooked trunk makes a tree unsuitable for the formal upright style, and suggests to the designer that the tree may be trained better as an informal upright or a slanted style instead. A damaged or highly asymmetrical tree may not appear suitable for bonsai development, yet may be adapted to an uncommon style like windswept or raft, which both work for trees that have branches only on one side of the trunk. Some tree species are not suitable for some styles: a bonsai artist working with a deciduous tree will not produce bonsai in the cascade style, for example. The designer can evaluate the pre-bonsai specimen against the catalog of accepted styles to determine what branches to remove or reshape, what foliage to remove or encourage, and what detailed shaping to apply to trunk and branches.

Although the styles will guide a bonsai designer, they are not completely deterministic. A review of actual bonsai from competition catalogs will reveal that even highly regarded specimens rarely meet every rule laid out for their style. The species of the bonsai, the age of the tree when it began bonsai training, the tree's pre-existing shape and structure, even the bonsai artist's training and preferences, strongly affect the shape of the resulting bonsai. These competing influences ensure that the style system acts mostly as a creative aid, not a dominating constraint, in producing a finished bonsai.

== Catalog of styles ==
Bonsai Styles
Trunk orientation
| Japanese | English | |
|---|---|---|
| Chokkan | Formal upright | The tree has a straight, upright, tapering trunk. Branches progress regularly from the thickest and broadest at the bottom to the finest and shortest at the top. This gives the branches a triangular shape and symmetry which is sought after for a formal upright style. There should be strong surface roots visible, moving from the base of the trunk downward into the soil, and radiating evenly around the trunk (preferably with none pointing directly toward the viewer). |
| Moyogi, takichi | Informal upright | The trunk and branches incorporate visible curves, but the apex, or tip, of the tree is located directly above the trunk's entry into the soil line. Similar to the formal upright style, branches progress regularly from largest at the bottom to smallest at the top, although this progression may be broken where the irregular shape of the trunk would make a branch abnormally prominent or obscure. |
| Shakan | Slanting | The trunk is straight like that of a bonsai grown in the formal upright style. However, the slant style trunk emerges from the soil at an angle, and the apex of the bonsai will be located to the left or right of the root base. Branches will generally parallel the ground, rather than growing at right angles to the slanted trunk. |
| Kengai | Cascade | Modeled after trees that grow from banks over water or down the side of a mountain. The apex of a (full) cascade style falls below the base of the pot. To give scope for the cascade shape, this style often appears in a tall, slender container not used elsewhere in bonsai. |
| Han-kengai | Semi-cascade | The apex of the tree extends just at the level of, or beneath, the lip of the bonsai pot. It does not fall below the bottom of the pot. |
| Takan-kengai | Multi-trunk cascade | This style applies to any cascade style in which two or more trunks cascade downwards. |
Trunk and bark surface
| Japanese | English | |
| Sabamiki | Split-trunk, hollow trunk | This style portrays the visual effect of a lightning strike or other severe and deep trunk damage, which has been weathered over time. It is applicable to deciduous species, conifers, and broadleaf evergreens. The hollowed trunk is usually chiseled, making a hollow that can range in size from a shallow scar to nearly the full depth of the trunk. |
| Sharimiki | Driftwood | This style portrays a tree with a significant part of its trunk bare of bark. In nature, trees in the sharimiki style are created by disease, physical damage to the trunk, weathering, and age. At least one strip of live bark must connect the leaves and living branches to the root system to transport water and nutrients. The bared trunk areas give a strong impression of age regardless of the tree's conformation, so driftwood bonsai often fall outside of the conventional styles in shape and foliage. |
Trunk and root placement
| Japanese | English | |
| Neagari | Exposed-root | The roots of the tree are exposed as extensions of the trunk, free from soil. The roots can extend as far as one-half to two-thirds the total tree height. |
| Sekijoju | Root-over-rock | The tree's roots are wrapped around a rock. The rock is at the base of the trunk, with the roots exposed to varying degrees as they traverse the rock and then descend into the soil below. |
| Ishizuke, ishitsuki | Clinging-to-a-rock | The roots of the tree grow in soil contained within the cracks and holes of the rock. The rock may serve as a simple container, with the tree escaping the container and forming its own shape, or the tree may show a closer relationship to the rock's shape, growing close to the rock and following its contours. |
Multiple trunks from a single root
| Japanese | English | |
| Sokan | Twin-trunk, two-trunk | Two trunks rise from a single set of roots. The base of the trunks generally touch and may be joined to each other up to a short distance above the soil. One trunk is taller and thicker than the other, and both are clearly visible from the bonsai's front. Branches from the two trunks extend left, right, and backwards, but not directly toward each other. |
| Sankan | Three-trunk | Three trunks rise from separate sets of roots. Trunk sizes are varied, with one dominant trunk being the thickest and generally the tallest. The three trunks are placed so that a straight line cannot intersect all three, to minimize symmetry and make the design look as natural as possible. |
| Gokan | Five-trunk | Modifying the stylistic constraints of the "three-trunk" style, the five-trunk style allows a second dominant tree to be placed in the design. This tree is subordinate to the largest in size. Larger-numbered group styles (seven-trunk, nine-trunk, forest, etc.) also allow a second or third tree to dominate additional groups of trees in the larger design. |
| Nanakan | Seven-trunk | (See "five-trunk".) |
| Kyukan | Nine-trunk | (See "five-trunk".) |
| Kabudachi, kabubuki | Clump | In the clump style, three or more (should be an odd number) trunks grow from a single point. The natural equivalent might be a group of trees that have sprouted from a single cone, or a collection of mature suckers springing from the base of a single tree. |
| Korabuki | Turtle, stump | This style is similar to the clump style, but the trunks do not rise from a fairly flat surface root system. Instead, the ground-level roots form a domed or turtle-back shape, and the multiple trunks rise from it. |
| Ikadabuki | Raft, straight-line | These styles mimic a natural phenomenon that occurs when a tree topples onto its side, for example, from soil eroding beneath the tree. Branches along the top side of the trunk continue to grow as a group of new trunks. Sometimes, roots will develop from buried portions of the trunk. Raft-style bonsai can have sinuous or straight-line trunks, all giving the illusion that they are a group of separate trees, while actually being the branches of a tree planted on its side. The straight-line style has all the trees in a single line. |
| Netsunagari, netsuranari | Raft, sinuous | This style is like the straight-line raft, but the underlying trunk has several bends in it. The trees growing up from it do not appear in a straight line. |
Multiple trunks on own roots
| Japanese | English | |
| Soju | Two-tree | In all multiple-trunk styles, conventional bonsai specimens use trees of the same species. As with the twin-trunk style, the two-tree style has a dominant, larger tree and a smaller one. The two trees may be set very close to one another, as in the twin-trunk style. They may also be set apart, as they do not share a single root. |
| Sambon-yose | Three-tree | The three-tree through nine-tree styles are considered "group settings" rather than forests. The smaller number of trees means that some stylistic goals, such as having no more than two trees in line with each other, may be applied to these bonsai. Trees in groups settings vary in trunk width and height, but generally resemble each other in proportions, density of foliage, and other visual characteristics. In the three-tree style, a single tree will be the dominant one. The other two will be smaller and usually differ in size from each other. |
| Gohon-yose | Five-tree | As for "three-tree", but there may be two dominant trees. One will be larger than the other, and the remaining three will be noticeably smaller. |
| Nanahon-yose | Seven-tree | (See five-tree.) |
| Kyuhon-yose | Nine-tree | (See five-tree.) |
| Yose-ue | Forest | This style describes a planting of many trees, typically an odd number unless too many to count easily, in a bonsai pot. The pot has very low sides, to emphasize the height of the trees, and may be replaced by a flat slab of rock. The trees are usually the same species, with a variety of heights employed to add visual interest and to reflect the age differences encountered in mature forests. (For mixed-species plantings, see the Japanese art of saikei.) The goal is to portray a view into a forest, and perspective effects, such as placing the smallest trees toward the rear, are important in developing a specimen in this style. |
Branch placement and orientation
| Japanese | English | |
| Bunjingi | Literati | This style has a generally bare trunk line, with branches reduced to a minimum, and typically placed near the apex of a long, often contorted trunk. This style derives its name from the Chinese literati who created Chinese brush paintings like those found in the ancient text, The Mustard Seed Garden Manual of Painting. Their minimalist landscapes often depicted trees growing in harsh conditions, with contorted trunks and reduced foliage. In Japan, the literati style is known as bunjin-gi (文人木). (Bunjin is a translation of the Chinese phrase wenren meaning "scholars practiced in the arts" and gi is a derivative of the Japanese word, ki, for "tree"). |
| Hokidachi | Broom | This style is employed for trees with extensive, fine branching, often with species like elms. The trunk is straight and upright. It branches out in all directions about a third of the way up the entire height of the tree. The branches and leaves form a ball-shaped crown, which can also be very beautiful during the winter months. |
| Takozukuri | Octopus | An uncommon style, these bonsai have a relatively short, thick trunk topped by several long branches that are contorted into curved shapes, fancifully resembling octopus tentacles. |
| Fukinagashi | Wind-swept | This style describes a tree that appears to be affected by strong winds blowing continuously from one direction, as might shape a tree atop a mountain ridge or on an exposed shoreline. The windswept characteristic can be applied to a number of the basic styles, including informal upright, slanting, and semi-cascade. Multi-tree bonsai can also be developed with elements of the windswept style. |

== Common styles ==
Upright or chokkan style

Informal upright style or moyogi style

Slanted or shakan style

Cascade or kengai style

Semi-cascade or han kengai style

Broom or hokidachi style

Multi-trunk or sokan style (twin-trunk style in this example)

Literati or bunjin-gi style

== See also ==
- Bonsai aesthetics
- Bonsai cultivation and care
- Deadwood bonsai techniques
- Indoor bonsai
- Penjing – Chinese precursor to bonsai
- Saikei – tray gardens using bonsai
