= Bonsai cultivation and care =

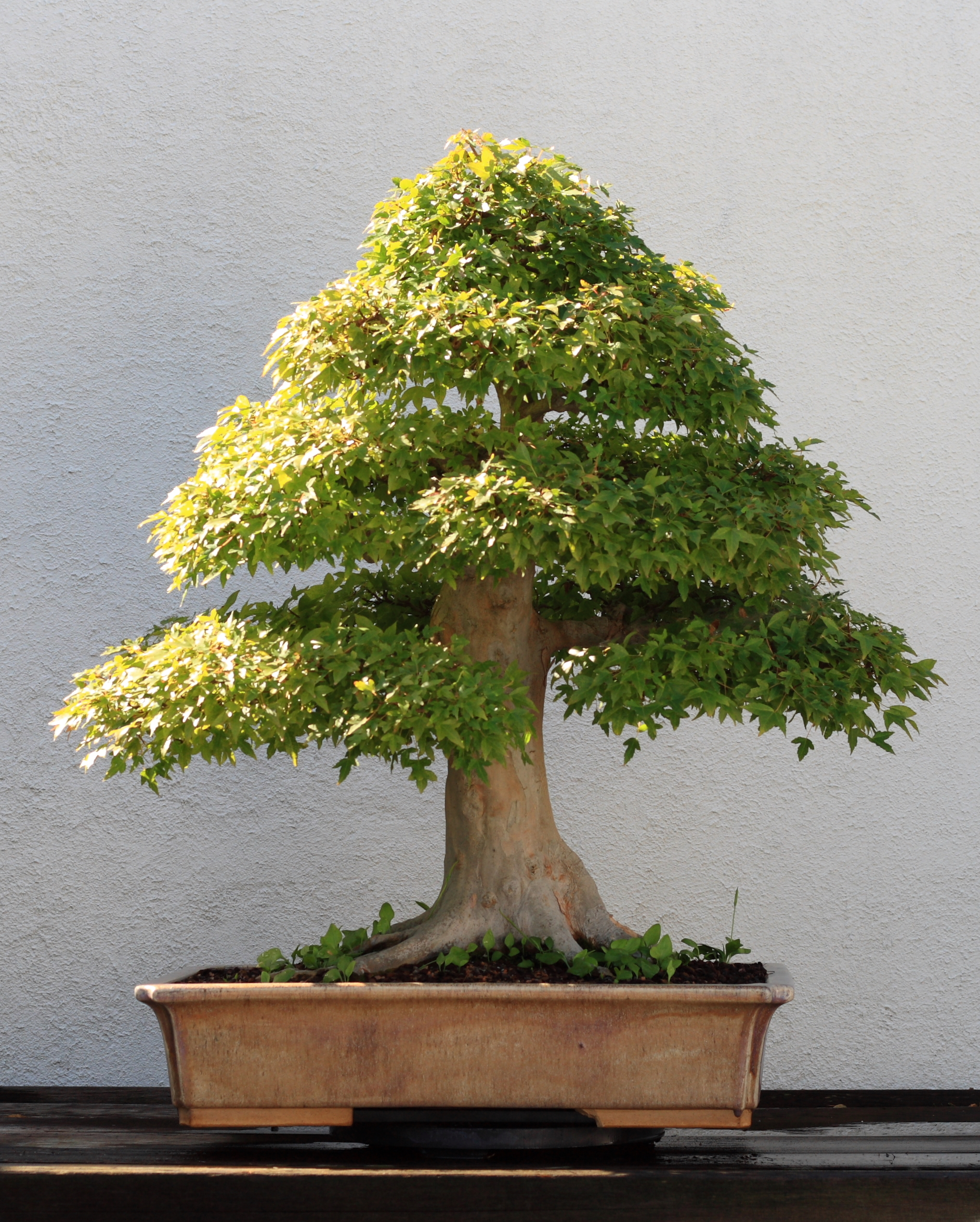
A Trident Maple bonsai from the National Bonsai & Penjing Museum at the United States National Arboretum.

Bonsai cultivation and care involves the long-term cultivation of small trees in containers, called bonsai in the Japanese tradition of this art form. Similar practices exist in other Japanese art forms and in other cultures, including saikei (Japanese), penjing (Chinese), and hòn non bộ (Vietnamese). Trees are difficult to cultivate in containers, which restrict root growth, nutrition uptake, and resources for transpiration (primarily soil moisture). In addition to the root constraints of containers, bonsai trunks, branches, and foliage are extensively shaped and manipulated to meet aesthetic goals. Specialized tools and techniques are used to protect the health and vigor of the subject tree. Over time, the artistic manipulation of small trees in containers has led to a number of cultivation and care approaches that successfully meet the practical and the artistic requirements of bonsai and similar traditions.

The term bonsai is generally used in English as an umbrella term for all miniature trees in containers or pots. In this article bonsai should be understood to include any container-grown tree that is regularly styled or shaped, not just one being maintained in the Japanese bonsai tradition.

Bonsai can be created from nearly any perennial woody-stemmed tree or shrub species which produces true branches and remains small through pot confinement with crown and root pruning. Some species are popular as bonsai material because they have characteristics, such as small leaves or needles, that make them appropriate for the compact visual scope of bonsai. Bonsai cultivation techniques are different from other tree cultivation techniques in allowing mature (though miniature) trees to grow in small containers, to survive with extremely restricted root and canopy structures, and to support comprehensive, repeated styling manipulations.

== Sources of Bonsai Material ==
All bonsai start with a specimen of source material, a plant that the grower wishes to train into bonsai form. Bonsai practice is an unusual form of plant cultivation in that growth from seeds is rarely used to obtain source material. To display the characteristic aged appearance of a bonsai within a reasonable time, the source plant is often partially grown or mature stock. A specimen may be selected specifically for bonsai aesthetic characteristics it already possesses, such as great natural age for a specimen collected in the wild, or a tapered, scar-free trunk from a nursery specimen. Alternatively, it may be selected for non-aesthetic reasons, such as known hardiness for the grower's local climate or low cost (as in the case of collected materials).

=== Propagation ===
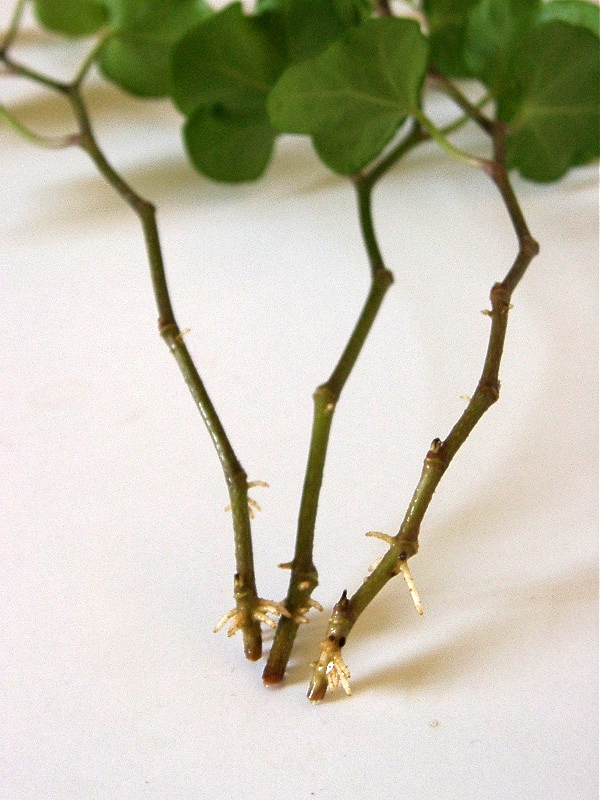
Plant cuttings can be rooted and grown as potential bonsai.

While any form of plant propagation could generate bonsai material, a few techniques are favored because they can quickly produce a relatively mature trunk with well-placed branches.

Cuttings. In taking a cutting, part of a growing plant is cut off and placed in a growing medium to develop roots. If the part that is cut off is fairly thick, like a mature branch, it can be grown into an aged-looking bonsai more quickly than can a seed. Thinner and younger cuttings tend to strike roots more easily than thicker or more mature ones. In bonsai propagation, cuttings usually provide source material to be grown for some time before training.

Layering. Layering is a technique in which rooting is encouraged from part of a plant, usually a branch, while it is still attached to the parent plant. After rooting, the branch is removed from the parent and grown as an independent entity. For bonsai, both ground layering and air layering can create a potential bonsai, by transforming a mature branch into the trunk of a new tree. The point at which rooting is encouraged can be close to the location of side branches, so the resulting rooted tree can immediately have a thick trunk and low branches, characteristics that complement bonsai aesthetics.

=== Commercial bonsai growers ===
Commercial bonsai growers may use any of the other means of obtaining starter bonsai material, from seed propagation to collecting expeditions, but they generally sell mature specimens that display bonsai aesthetic qualities already. The grower trains the source specimens to a greater or lesser extent before sale, and the trees may be ready for display as soon as they are bought. Those who purchase commercially grown bonsai face some challenges, however, particularly of buying from another country. If the purchaser's local climate does not closely match the climate in which the bonsai was created, the plant will have difficulties surviving and thriving. As well, importing living plant material from a foreign source is often closely controlled by import regulations and may require a license or other special import arrangement on the buyer's part. If a local commercial bonsai grower does not exist, buying from a distant one may be unsatisfactory.

=== Nursery Stock ===
A plant nursery is an agricultural operation where (non-bonsai) plants are propagated and grown to usable size. Nursery stock may be available directly from the nursery, or may be sold in a garden centre or similar resale establishment. Nursery stock is usually young but fully viable, and is often potted with sufficient soil to allow plants to survive a season or two before being transplanted into a more permanent location. Because the nursery tree is already pot-conditioned, it can be worked on as a bonsai immediately. The large number of plants that can be viewed in a single visit to a nursery or garden centre allows the buyer to identify plants with better-than-average bonsai characteristics. According to Peter Adams, a nursery visit "offers the opportunity to choose an instant trunk". One issue with nursery stock is that many specimens are shaped into popular forms, such as the standard or half-standard forms, with several feet of clear trunk rising from the roots. Without branches low on the trunk, it is difficult for a source specimen to be trained as bonsai.

=== Collecting ===
Collecting bonsai consists of finding suitable bonsai material in its natural environment, successfully moving it, and replanting it in a container for development as bonsai. Collecting may involve wild materials from naturally treed areas, or cultivated specimens found growing in private yards and gardens. For example, mature landscape plants being discarded from a building site can provide excellent material for bonsai. Hedgerow trees, grown for many years but continually trimmed to hedge height, provide heavy, gnarled trunks for bonsai collectors. In locations close to a tree line (the line beyond which trees do not grow, whether due to altitude, temperature, soil moisture, or other conditions), aged and naturally dwarfed survivors can be found.

The main benefit of collecting bonsai specimens is that collected materials can be mature, and will display the natural marks and forms of age, which makes them more suitable for bonsai development than the young plants obtained through nurseries. Low cost is another potential benefit, with a tree harvest license often being more economical than the purchase of nursery trees. Some of the difficulties of collecting include finding suitable specimens, getting permission to remove them, and the challenges of keeping a mature tree alive while transplanting it to a bonsai pot.

== Styling Techniques ==
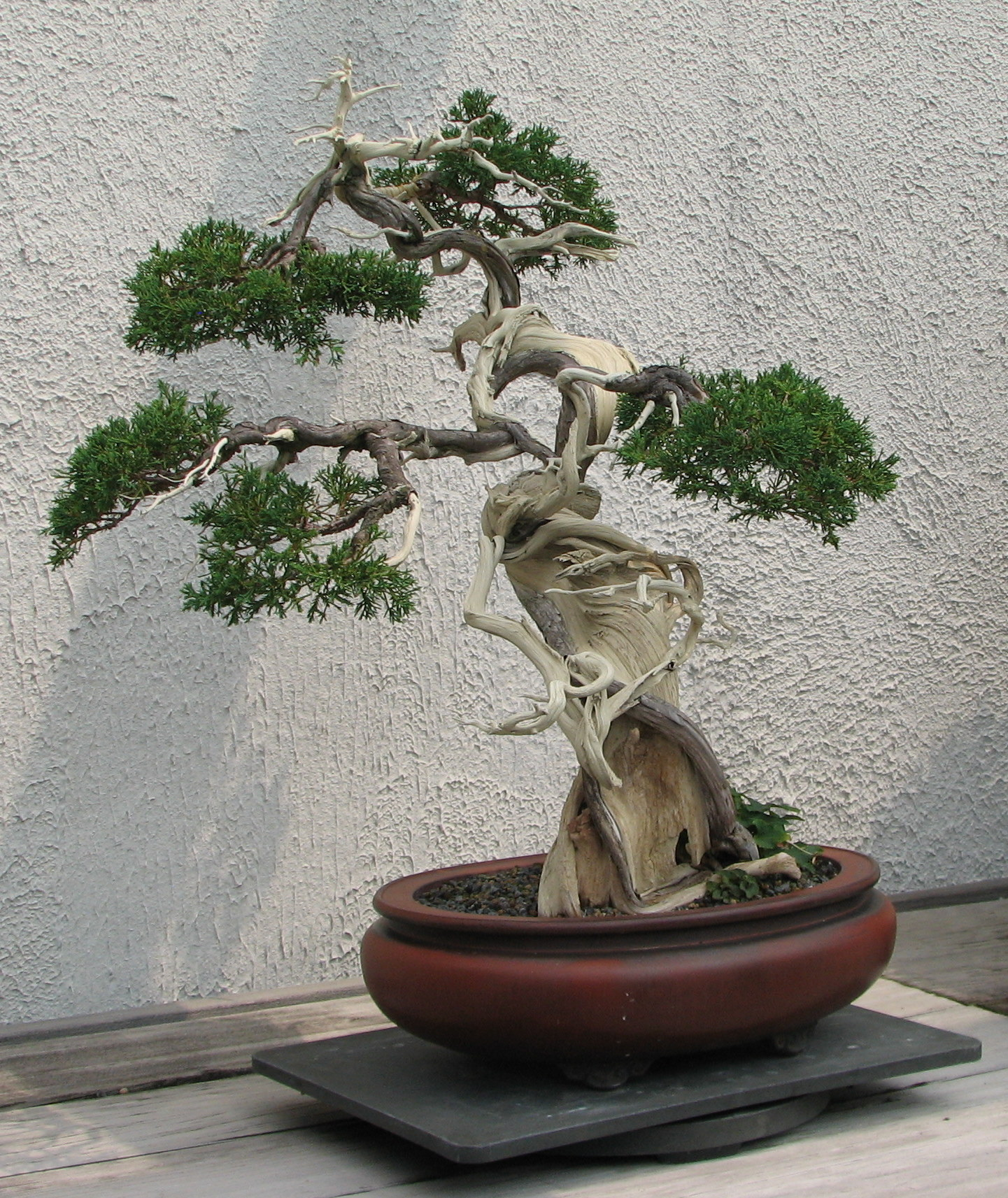
This juniper makes extensive use of both jin (deadwood branches) and shari (trunk deadwood).

Bonsai are carefully styled to maintain miniaturization, to suggest age, and to meet the artist's aesthetic goals. Tree styling also occurs in a larger scale in other practices like topiary and niwaki. In bonsai, however, the artist has close control over every feature of the tree, because it is small and (in its container) easily moved and worked on. The greater scale of full-sized trees means that styling them may be restricted to pruning and shaping the exterior volume once per growing season, never pruning within the canopy nor bending and forming individual branches. In contrast, in a bonsai being prepared for display, each leaf or needle may be subject to decision regarding pruning or retention, and every branch and twig may be formed and wired into place each year. Given these differences in scope and purpose, bonsai styling uses a number of styling techniques either unique to bonsai or (if used in other forms of plant cultivation) applied in ways particularly suitable to meet the goals of bonsai development.

=== Leaf Trimming ===
This technique involves selective removal of leaves (for most varieties of deciduous tree) or needles (for coniferous trees and some others) from a bonsai's branches. A common aesthetic technique in bonsai design is to expose the tree's branches below groups of leaves or needles (sometimes called "pads") by removing downward-growing material. In many species, particularly coniferous ones, this means that leaves or needles projecting below their branches must be trimmed off. For some coniferous varieties, such as spruce, branches carry needles from the trunk to the tip and many of these needles may be trimmed to expose the branch shape and bark. Needle and bud trimming can also be used in coniferous trees to force back-budding on old wood, which may not occur naturally in many conifers. Along with pruning, leaf trimming is the most common activity used for bonsai development and maintenance, and the one that occurs most frequently during the year.

=== Pruning ===
The small size of the tree and some dwarfing of foliage result from pruning the trunk, branches, and roots. Pruning is often the first step in transforming a collected plant specimen into a candidate for bonsai. The top part of the trunk may be removed to make the tree more compact. Major and minor branches that conflict with the designer's plan will be removed completely, and others may be shortened to fit within the planned design. Pruning later in the bonsai's life is generally less severe, and may be done for purposes like increasing branch ramification or encouraging growth of non-pruned branches. Although pruning is an important and common bonsai practice, it must be done with care, as improper pruning can weaken or kill trees. Careful pruning throughout the tree's life is necessary, however, to maintain a bonsai's basic design, which can otherwise disappear behind the uncontrolled natural growth of branches and leaves.

=== Wiring ===
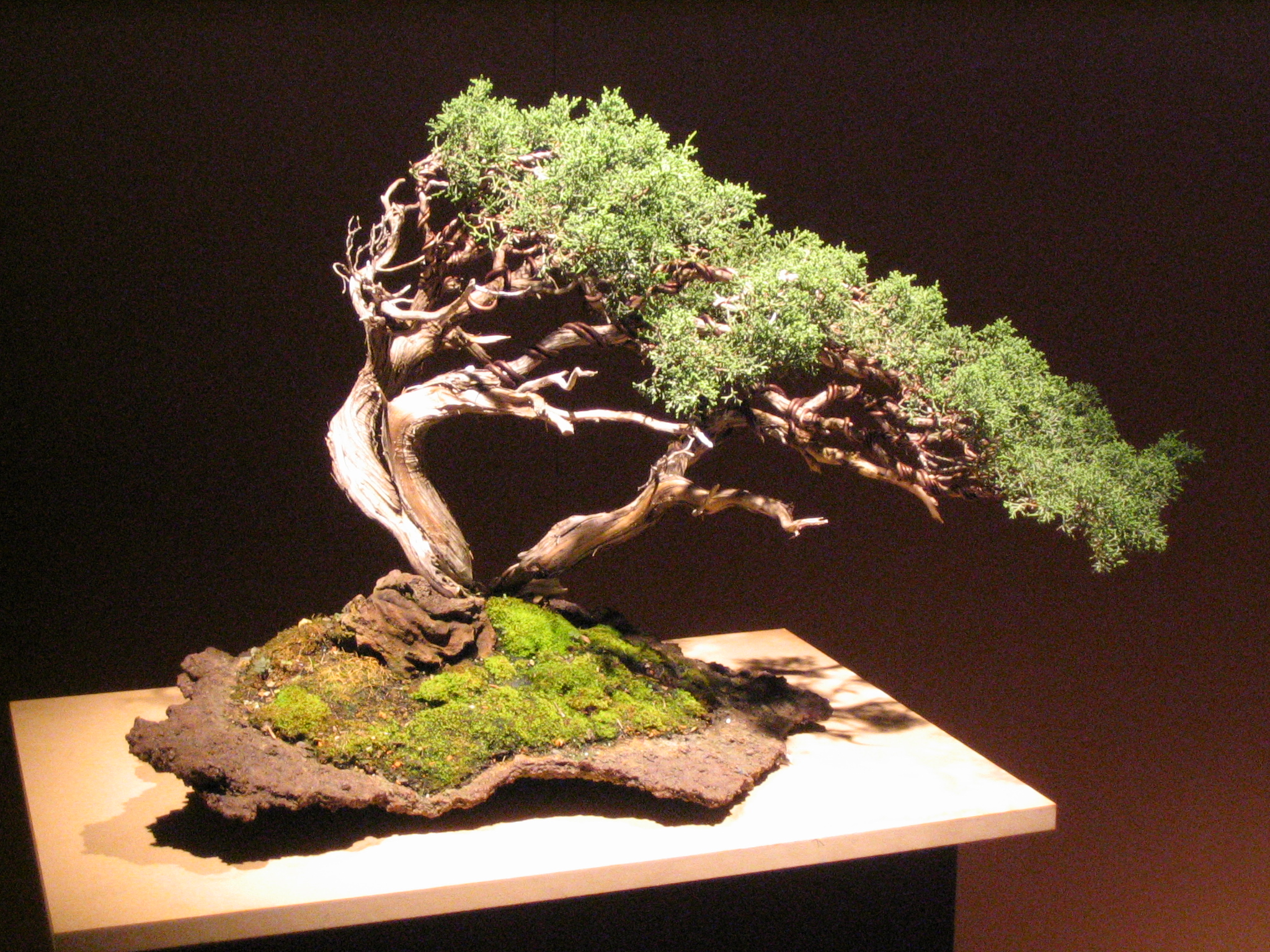
Extensive wiring can be seen on this bonsai specimen.

Wrapping copper or aluminium wire around branches and trunks allows the bonsai designer to create the desired general form and make detailed branch and leaf placements. When wire is used on new branches or shoots, it holds the branches in place until they lignify (convert into wood). The time required is usually 6–9 months or one growing season for deciduous trees, but can be several years for conifers like pines and spruce, which maintain their branch flexibility through multiple growing seasons. Wires are also used to connect a branch to another object (e.g., another branch, the pot itself) so that tightening the wire applies force to the branch. Some species do not lignify strongly, and some specimens' branches are too stiff or brittle to be bent easily. These cases are not conducive to wiring, and shaping them is accomplished primarily through pruning.

=== Clamping ===
For larger specimens, or species with stiffer wood, bonsai artists also use mechanical devices for shaping trunks and branches. The most common are screw-based clamps, which can straighten or bend a part of the bonsai using much greater force than wiring can supply. To prevent damage to the tree, the clamps are tightened a little at a time and make their changes over a period of months or years.

=== Grafting ===
In this technique, new growing material (typically a bud, branch, or root) is introduced to a prepared area under the bark of the tree. There are two major purposes for grafting in bonsai. First, a number of favorite species do not thrive as bonsai on their natural root stock and their trunks are often grafted onto hardier root stock. Examples include Japanese red maple and Japanese black pine. Second, grafting allows the bonsai artist to add branches (and sometimes roots) where they are needed to improve or complete a bonsai design. There are many applicable grafting techniques, none unique to bonsai, including branch grafting, bud grafting, thread grafting, and others.

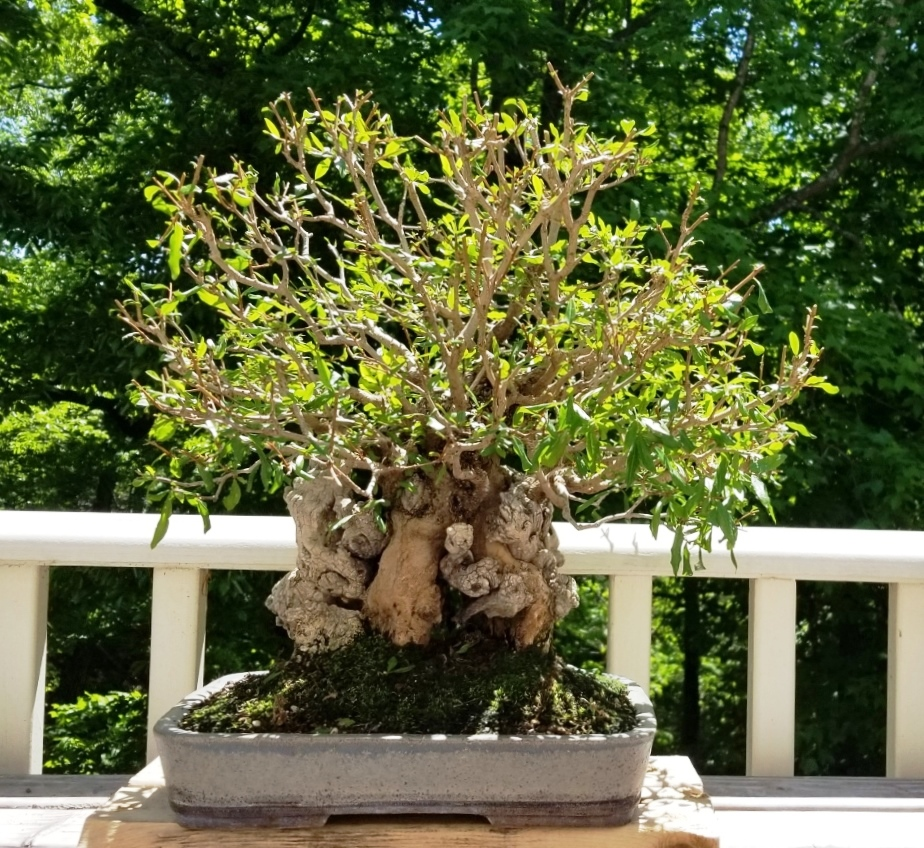
Sample of a Pomegranate trained as bonsai, and shown after a late spring partial defoliation. This specimen was collected in the wild in California, the tree is estimated to be 125 to 175 years old. Note the sections of trunk deadwood which give character and reflect the old age of the tree.

=== Defoliation ===
Short-term dwarfing of foliage can be accomplished in certain deciduous bonsai by partial or total defoliation of the plant partway through the growing season. Not all species can survive this technique. In defoliating a healthy tree of a suitable species, most or all of the leaves are removed by clipping partway along each leaf's petiole (the thin stem that connects a leaf to its branch). Petioles later dry up and drop off or are manually removed once dry. The tree responds by producing a fresh crop of leaves. The new leaves are generally much smaller than those from the first crop, sometimes as small as half the length and width. If the bonsai is shown at this time, the smaller leaves contribute greatly to the bonsai aesthetic of dwarfing. This change in leaf size is usually not permanent, and the leaves of the following spring will often be the normal size. Defoliation weakens the tree and should not be performed in two consecutive years.

Another benefit of defoliation is the encouragement of back budding, that is, the formation of new buds on existing branches. This results in finer and more intricate branching in the inside of the tree's canopy, adding to the refinement of the bonsai.

Some species, like the Acer buergerianum (trident maple), respond particularly well to defoliation, and can be defoliated, in some cases, up to three or four times in a single growing season. This accelerates refinement greatly, shortening the developmental timeline of the bonsai.

=== Deadwood ===
Bonsai growers create or shape dead wood using techniques such as jin and shari to simulate age and maturity in a bonsai. Jin is the term used when the bark from an entire branch is removed to create the impression of a snag of deadwood. Shari denotes stripping bark from areas of the trunk to simulate natural scarring from a broken limb or lightning strike. In addition to stripping bark, deadwood techniques may also involve the use of tools to scar the deadwood or to raise its grain, and the application of chemicals (usually lime sulfur) to bleach and preserve the exposed deadwood.

=== "Hedge Cutting Method" ===
This method is a newer, somewhat controversial technique to achieve fine ramification on deciduous material. In it, a tree which is still in development is left to grow until its foliage is very dense and somewhat "messy." Then, its crown is aggressively cut back in the spring, and the cycle begins again. Austrian-German bonsai artist Walter Pall is credited with creating the method.

== Care ==
Small trees grown in containers, like bonsai, require specialized care. Unlike most houseplants, flowering shrubs, and other subjects of container gardening, tree species in the wild generally grow individual roots up to several meters long and root structures encompassing hundreds or thousands of liters of soil. In contrast, a typical bonsai container allows a fraction of a meter for root extension, and holds 2 to 10 liters of soil and root mass. Branch and leaf (or needle) growth in trees is also large-scale in nature. Wild trees typically grow 5 meters or taller when mature, while the largest bonsai rarely exceed 1 meter and most specimens are significantly smaller. These size differences affect maturation, transpiration, nutrition, pest resistance, and many other aspects of tree biology. Maintaining the long-term health of a tree in a container requires a number of specialized care techniques.

=== Growing Environment ===
Most bonsai species are trees and shrubs that must by nature grow outdoors. They require temperature, humidity, and sunlight conditions approximating their native climate year round. The skill of the grower can help bonsai from outside the local hardiness zone survive and even thrive, but doing so takes careful watering, shielding of selected bonsai from excessive sunlight or wind, and possibly protection from winter conditions (e.g., through the use of cold frames or winter greenhouses).

Common bonsai species (particularly those from the Japanese tradition) are temperate climate trees from hardiness zones 7 to 9, and require moderate temperatures, moderate humidity, and full sun in summer with a dormancy period in winter that may need to be near freezing. They do not thrive indoors, where the light is generally too dim, and humidity often too low, for them to grow properly. Only during their dormant period can they safely be brought indoors, and even then the plants require cold temperatures, reduced watering, and lighting that approximates the number of hours the sun is visible. Raising the temperature or providing more hours of light than available from natural daylight can cause the bonsai to break dormancy, which often weakens or kills it.

Even for bonsai specimens that are native to the grower's location, outdoor cultivation requires specific cultivation practices to ensure successful long-term survival of the bonsai. The trees used in bonsai are constrained by the need to grow in a relatively small pot. This state greatly reduces the volume of roots and soil normally available to a freely grown tree, and brings the roots much closer to the surface of the soil than would occur in the wild. Trees in bonsai pots have much less access to water and to nutrients than they do natively, and physically confining roots changes their growth pattern and indirectly the growth pattern of the tree above the soil.

The grower has some control over the following environmental variables, and by controlling them effectively for individual specimens can ensure the health of native species grown as bonsai, and can cultivate some non-native species successfully.

- Watering: Different species of tree have roots with different tolerances for soil moisture. Some species tolerate continual wetness, while others are prone to rotting if the soil remains wet for long periods. A standard bonsai practice is to grow trees in a soil mixture that drains rapidly, so that roots are not allowed to be wet for long. To compensate for the relatively low water retention of the bonsai soil, water is applied frequently. The tree absorbs sufficient moisture for its needs while the water is passing through the soil, then the soil dries enough to reduce the chance of rotting. It is the grower's responsibility to ensure that watering occurs frequently enough to satisfy the bonsai with high watering requirements, while not waterlogging trees that use little water or have roots prone to rotting.
- Soil volume: Giving a bonsai a relatively large soil volume encourages the growth of roots, then corresponding growth of the rest of the tree. With a large amount of soil, the tree trunk extends in length and increases in diameter, existing branches increase in size and new branches appear, and the foliage expands in volume. The grower can move an outdoor bonsai from a pot to a training box or to open ground to stimulate this sort of growth. Replacing the tree in a bonsai pot will slow or halt the tree's growth, and may lead to die-back if the volume of foliage is too great for the limited root system to support. Managing the tree's available soil volume allows the grower to manage the overall size of the bonsai, and to increase vigor and growth when new branches are required for a planned styling.
- Temperature: Bonsai roots in pots are exposed to much greater variation in temperature than tree roots deep in the soil. For bonsai from native species, local temperatures do not generally harm the tree. But for bonsai from warmer native climates, the grower can increase the likelihood of successful cultivation either by insulating the tree from local winter conditions, or by actively increasing the bonsai temperature during the cold season. For trees from climates slightly warmer than the local one, bonsai pots can be partially buried in the ground and can be covered with an insulating layer of mulch. For trees from significantly warmer climates, warmer temperatures can be maintained in a cold frame or greenhouse, so that a relatively tender tree is not exposed to temperatures lower than it can bear. This approach may also artificially extend the bonsai's growing season, affecting watering and fertilization schedules.
- Sunlight: Trees generally require a good deal of sun, and most bonsai need direct sunlight during the growing season to thrive. Some shade-tolerant species of bonsai cannot thrive with too much direct sunlight, however, and it is the grower's role to site the bonsai specimens to provide the correct lighting for each type. Most bonsai will be located in an area that gets several hours of direct daylight. Shade-tolerant bonsai can be placed behind barriers (walls, buildings), sited on shaded benches or stands, or shaded by netting to reduce the impact of direct sunlight.

=== Repotting ===
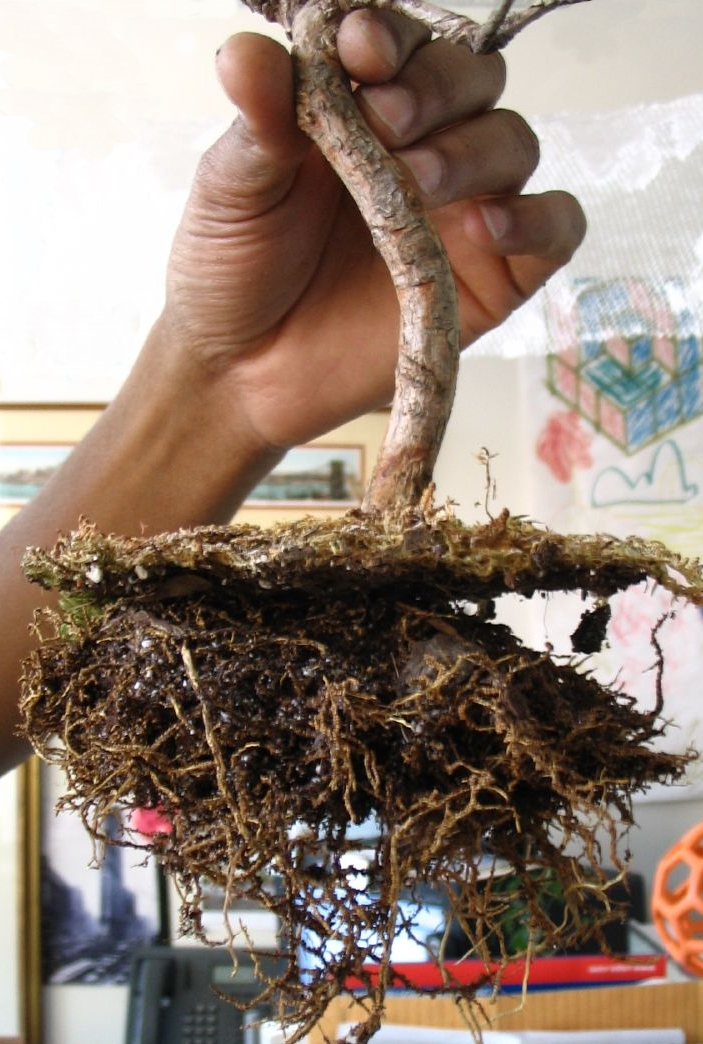
An uprooted bonsai, ready for repotting

Bonsai are repotted and root-pruned at intervals dictated by the vigor and age of each tree. In the case of deciduous trees, this is done as the tree is leaving its dormant period, generally around springtime. Bonsai are often repotted while in development, and less often as they become more mature. This prevents them from becoming pot-bound and encourages the growth of new feeder roots, allowing the tree to absorb moisture more efficiently.

Specimens meant to be developed into bonsai are often placed in "growing boxes", which have a much larger volume of soil per plant than a bonsai pot does. These large boxes allow the roots to grow freely, increasing the vigor of the tree and helping the trunk and branches grow thicker. After using a grow box, the tree may be replanted in a more compact "training box" that helps to create a smaller, denser root mass which can be more easily moved into a final presentation pot.

=== Tools ===
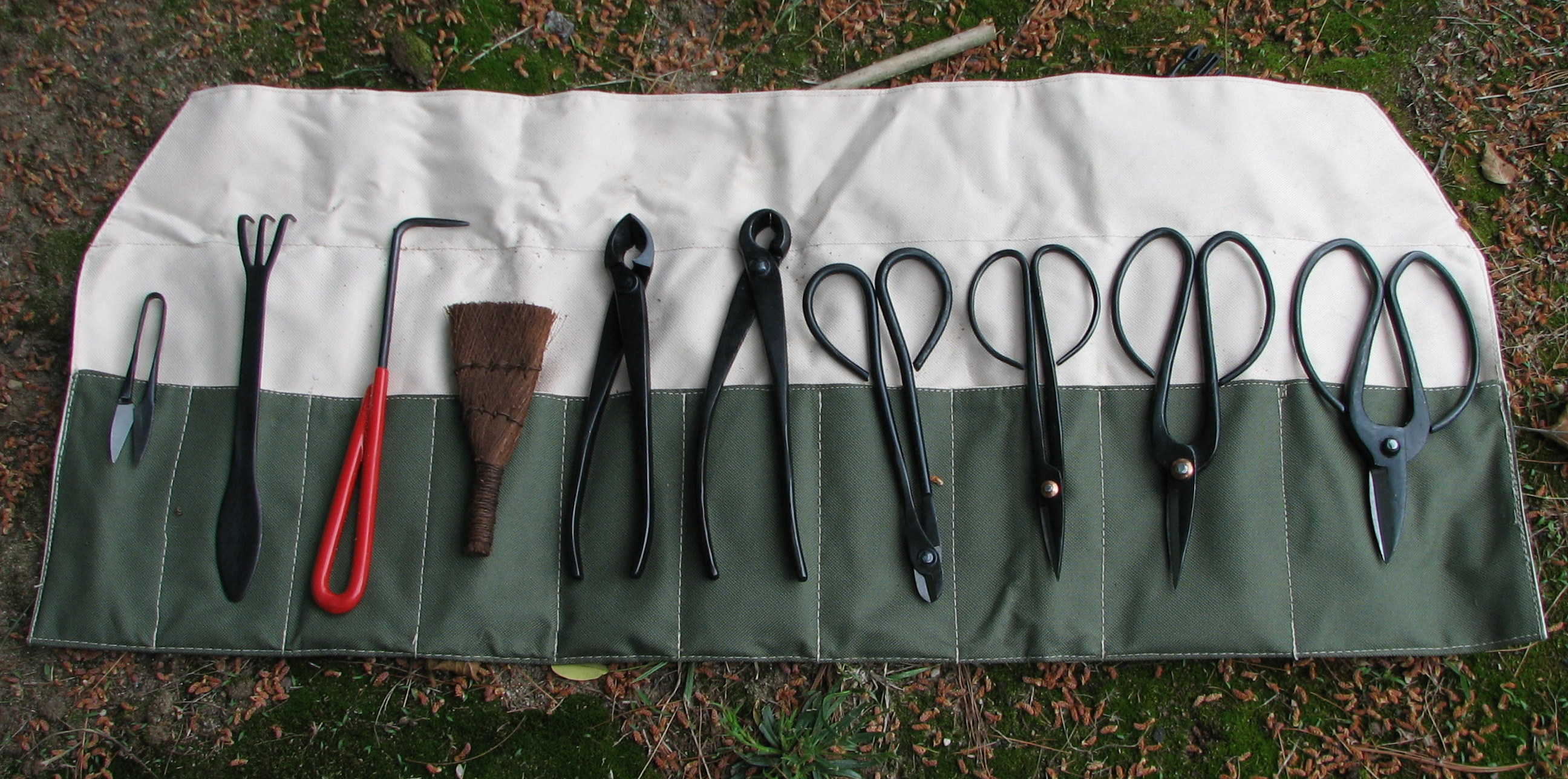
Set of bonsai tools (left to right): leaf trimmer; rake with spatula; root hook; coir brush; concave cutter; knob cutter; wire cutter; small, medium and large shears

Special tools are available for the maintenance of bonsai. The most common tool is the concave cutter (5th from left in picture), a tool designed to prune flush, without leaving a stub. Other tools include branch bending jacks, wire pliers and shears of different proportions for performing detail and rough shaping.

=== Soil and fertilization ===
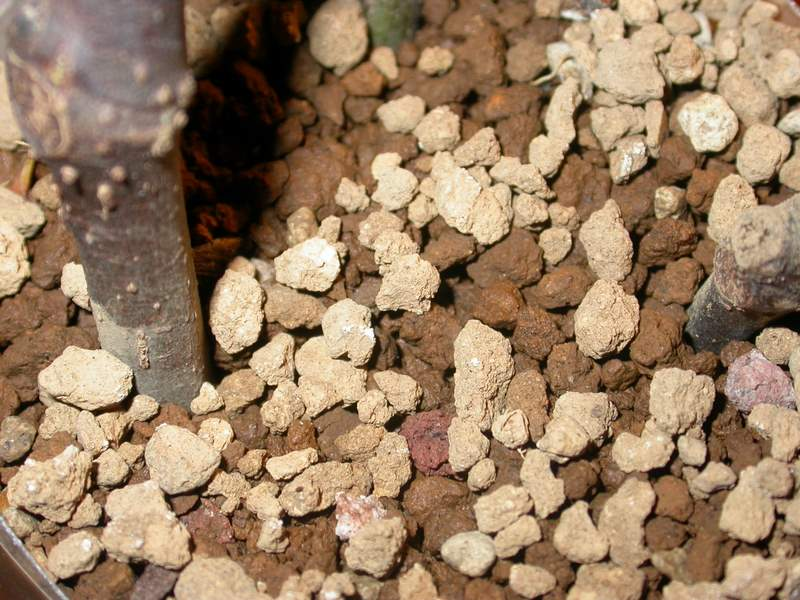
Akadama soil

Bonsai soil is usually a loose, fast-draining mix of components, often a base mixture of coarse sand or gravel, fired clay pellets, or expanded shale combined with an organic component such as peat or bark. The inorganic components provide mechanical support for bonsai roots, and—in the case of fired clay materials—also serve to retain moisture. The organic components retain moisture and may release small amounts of nutrients as they decay.

In Japan, bonsai soil mixes based on volcanic clays are common. The volcanic clay has been fired at some point in time to create porous, water-retaining pellets. Varieties such as akadama, or "red ball" soil, and kanuma, a type of yellow pumice used for azaleas and other calcifuges, are used by many bonsai growers. Similar fired clay soil components are extracted or manufactured in other countries around the world, and other soil components like diatomaceous earth can fill a similar purpose in bonsai cultivation.

Opinions about fertilizers and fertilization techniques vary widely among practitioners. Some promote the use of organic fertilizers to augment an essentially inorganic soil mix, while others will use chemical fertilizers freely. Many follow the general rule of little and often, where a dilute fertilizer solution or a small amount of dry fertilizer are applied relatively frequently during the tree's growing season. The flushing effect of regular watering moves unmetabolized fertilizer out of the soil, preventing the potentially toxic build-up of fertilizer ingredients.

=== Pest management ===
The common pests afflicting bonsai include insects both above and beneath the soil, and infections, usually fungal. A tree grown as a bonsai is subject to the pests that affect the same species full-grown, and also to pests common to other potted plants. Most pests are species-specific, so a detailed understanding of the specific bonsai species is necessary for identifying and treating most pests. The same materials and techniques used for other affected plants can be applied to the bonsai, with some relatively minor variation. Pesticide chemicals are usually diluted more for bonsai than for a larger plant, as a regular-strength application may overwhelm the smaller bonsai's biological processes.

=== Location ===
==== Outdoors ====
Bonsai are sometimes marketed or promoted as house plants, but few of the traditional bonsai species can thrive or even survive inside a typical house. Most bonsai are grown outdoors. The best guideline to identifying a suitable growing environment for a bonsai is its native hardiness. If the bonsai grower can closely replicate the full year's temperatures, relative humidity, and sunlight, the bonsai should do well. In practice, this means that trees from a hardiness zone closely matching the grower's location will generally be the easiest to grow, and others will require more work or will not be viable at all.

==== Indoors ====
Tropical and Mediterranean species typically require consistent temperatures close to room temperature, and with correct lighting and humidity many species can be kept indoors all year. Those from cooler climates may benefit from a winter dormancy period, but temperatures need not be dropped as far as for the temperate climate plants and a north-facing windowsill or open window may provide the right conditions for a few winter months.

== See also ==
- Bonsai
- Indoor bonsai
- Bonsai aesthetics
- Penjing – Chinese precursor to bonsai
- Saikei – tray gardens using live trees
