= Ramification (botany) =

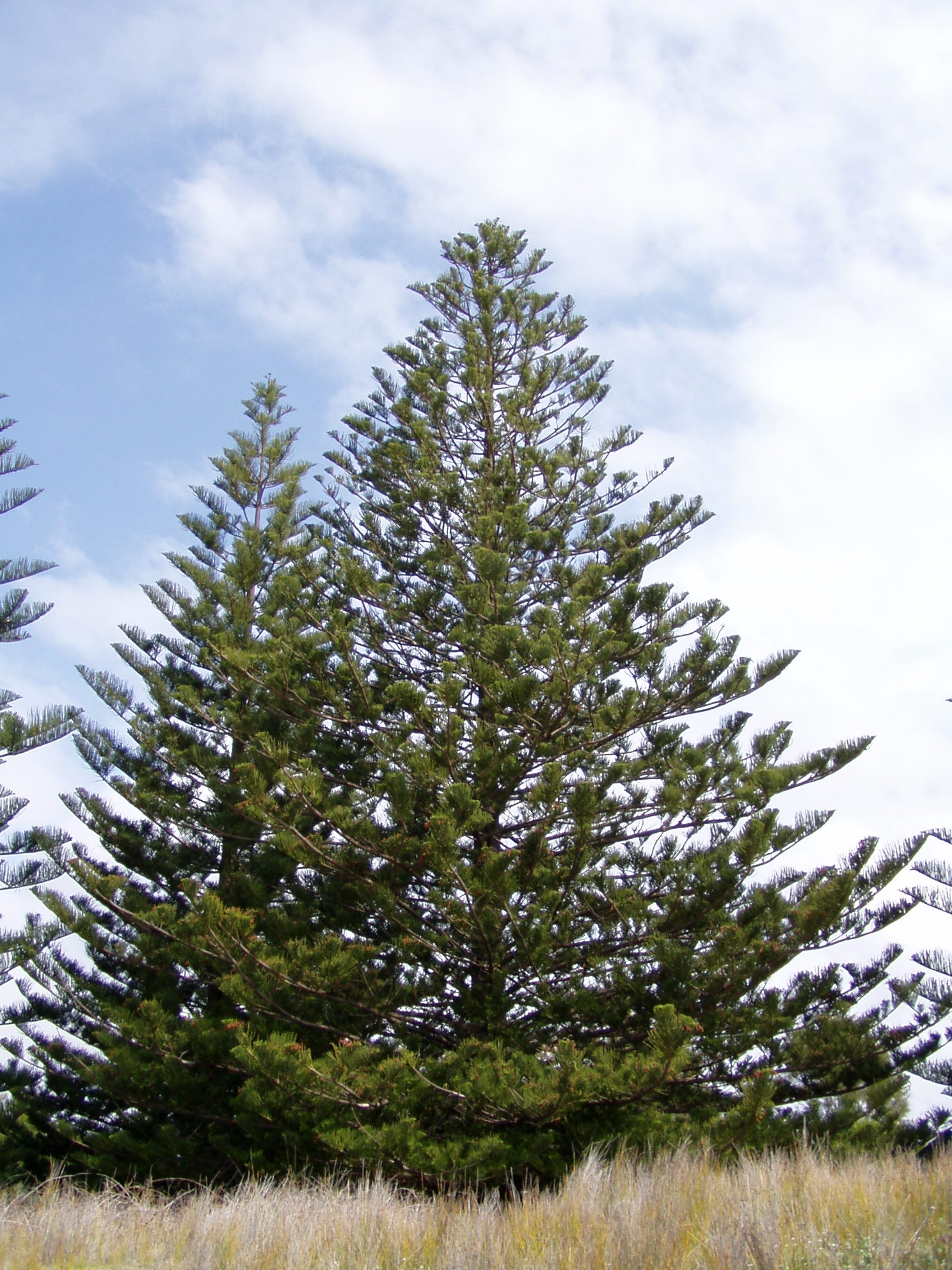
Naturally occurring ramification helps gives these conifers a regular, cone-shaped outline.

In botany, ramification is the divergence of the stem and limbs of a plant into smaller ones, i.e., trunk into branches, branches into increasingly smaller branches, and so on. Gardeners stimulate the process of ramification through pruning, thereby making trees, shrubs, and other plants bushier and denser.

Short internodes (the section of stem between nodes, i.e., areas where leaves are produced) help increase ramification in those plants that form branches at these nodes. Long internodes (which may be the result of over-watering, the over-use of fertilizer, or a seasonal "growth spurt") decrease a gardener's ability to induce ramification in a plant.

A high degree of ramification is essential for the creation of topiary as it enables the topiary artist to carve a bush or hedge into a shape with an even surface. Ramification is also essential to practitioners of the art of bonsai as it helps re-create the form and habit of a full-size tree in a small tree grown in a container.

The pruning practices of coppicing and pollarding induce ramification by removing most of a tree's mass above the root. Fruit tree pruning increases the yield of orchards by inducing ramification and thereby creating many vigorous, fruitful branches in the place of a few less-fruitful ones.
