= Bonsai aesthetics =

Aspects of the Japanese tradition of miniature tree growth

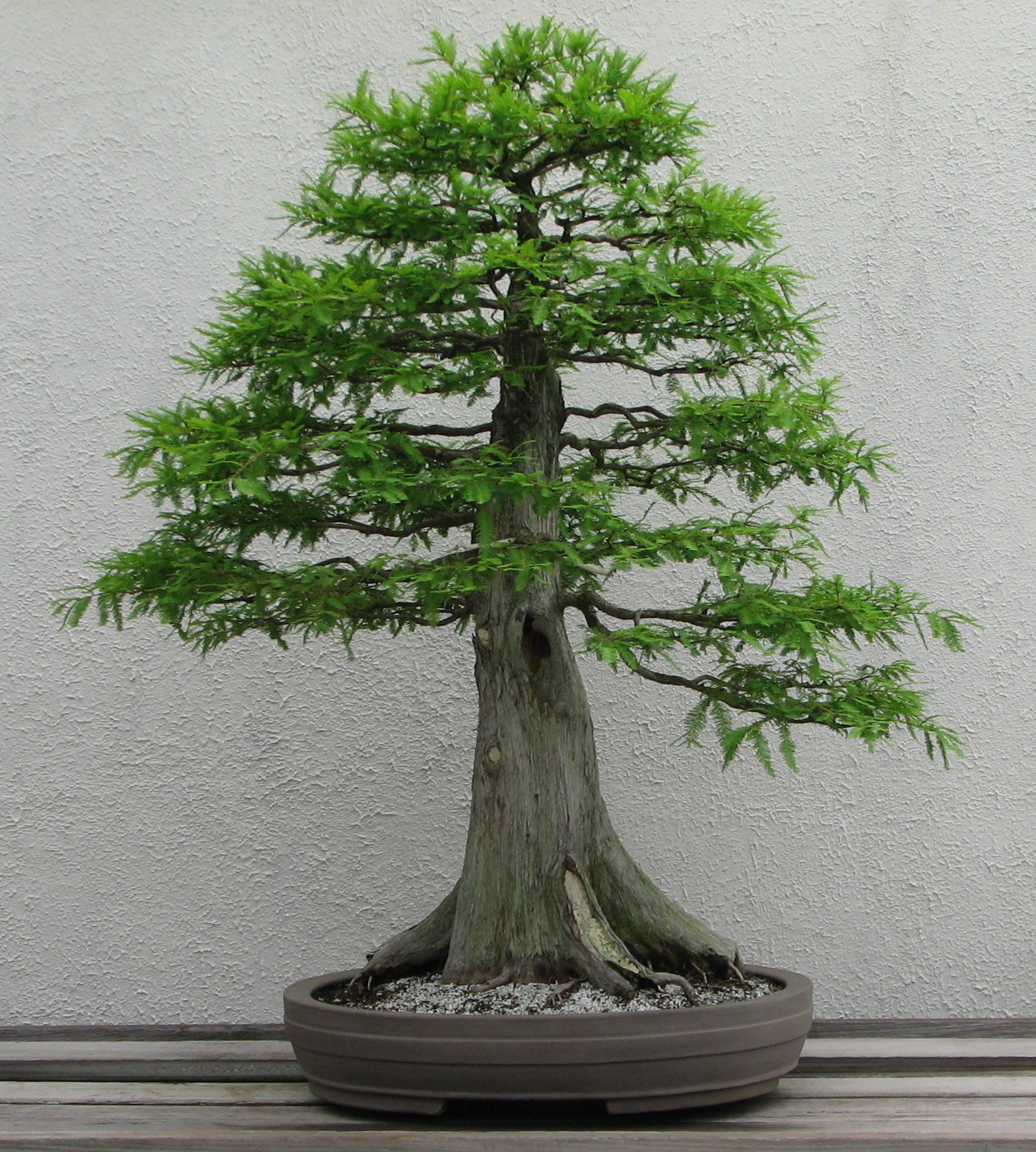
A bald cypress in the formal upright style.

Bonsai aesthetics are the aesthetic goals and characteristics of the Japanese tradition of the art of bonsai, the growing of a miniature tree in a container. Many Japanese cultural characteristics, particularly the influence of Zen Buddhism and the expression wabi-sabi inform the bonsai tradition in that culture. A lengthy catalog of conventional tree shapes and styles also helps provide cohesion to the Japanese styling tradition. A number of other cultures around the world have adopted the Japanese approach to bonsai, and while some variations have begun to appear, most hew closely to the rules and design philosophies of the Japanese tradition.

Penjing, a Chinese form of container-grown tree, predates and is the origin of bonsai. It has a distinct aesthetic, however, as does the art of saikei, Japanese miniature multi-tree landscapes in a container.

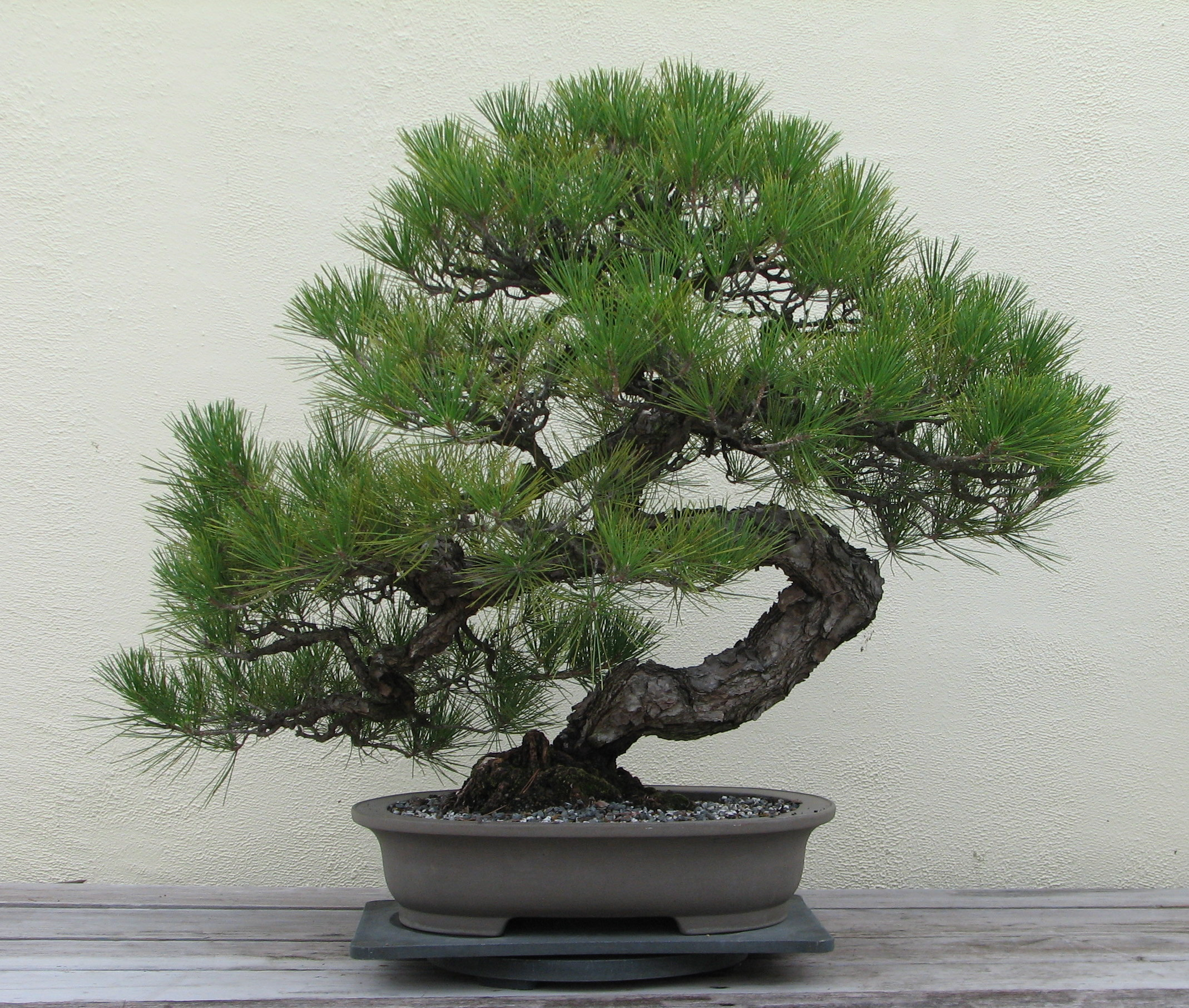
A Japanese Black Pine in an informal style.

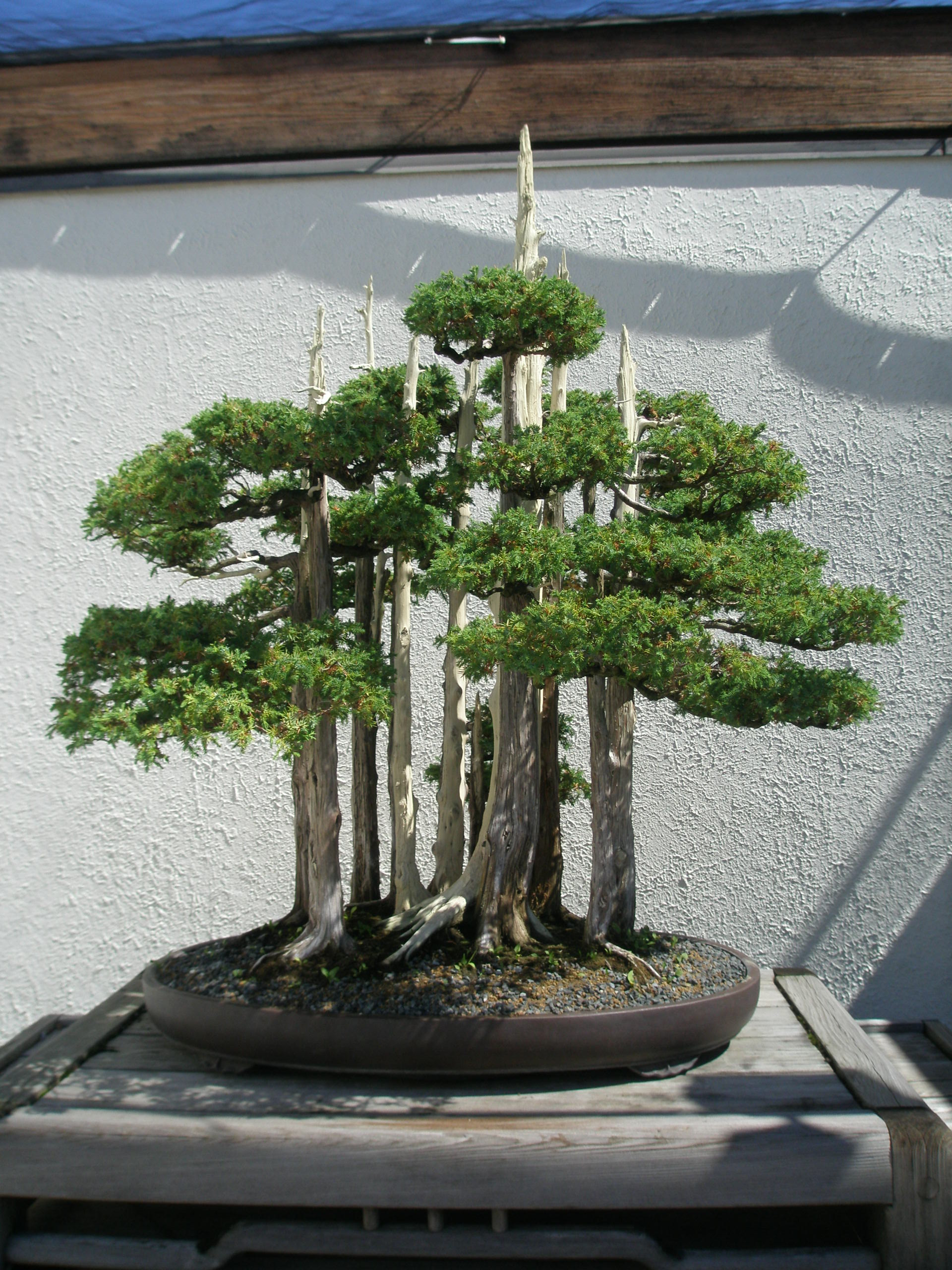
John Naka's famous bonsai Goshin, showing some deadwood effects.

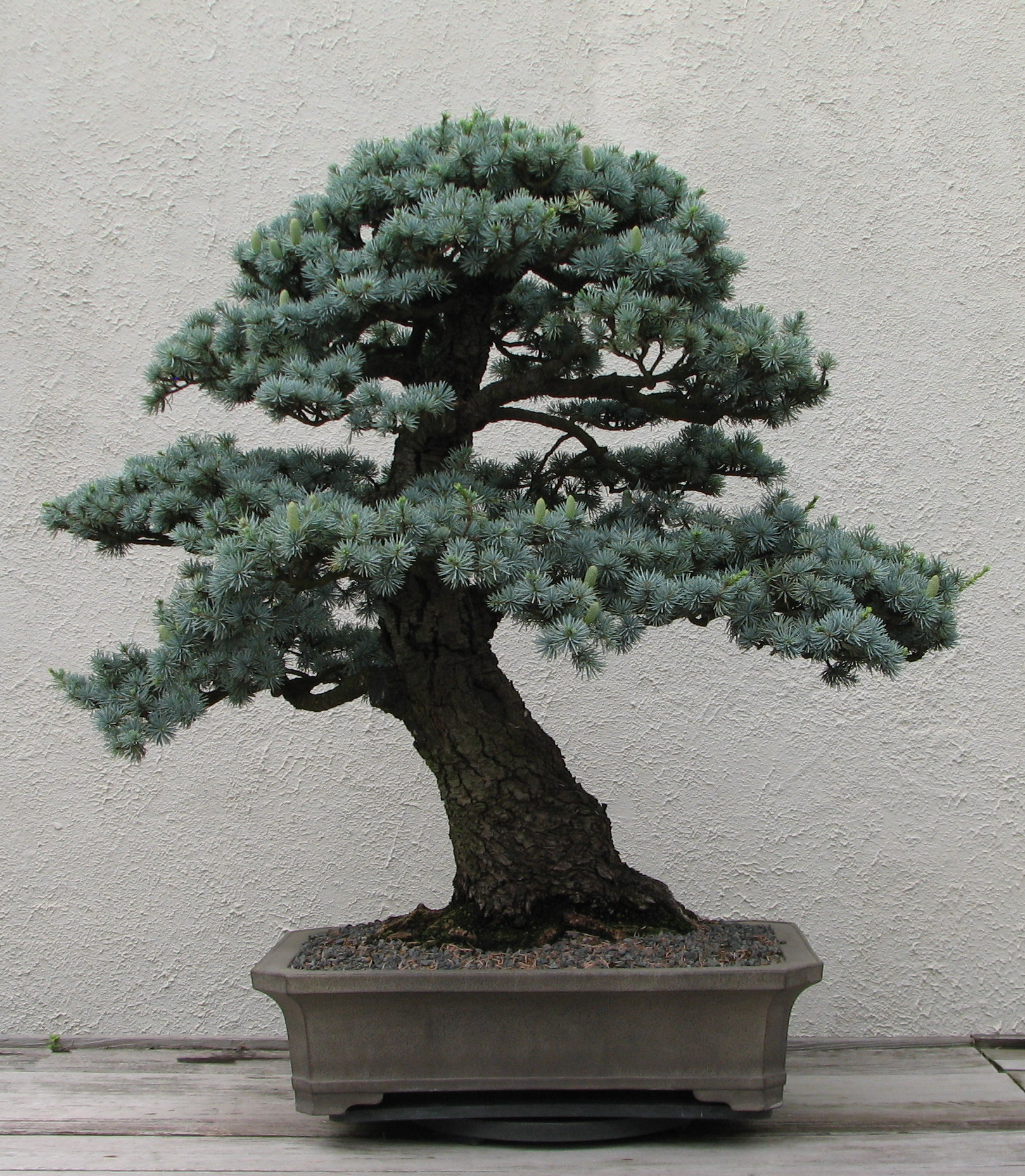
A Blue Atlas Cedar (Cedrus libani var. atlantica) bonsai on display at the National Bonsai & Penjing Museum at the United States National Arboretum.

Over centuries of practice, the Japanese bonsai aesthetic has encoded some important methods and aesthetic guidelines. Like the type of aesthetic rules that govern, for example, Western common practice period music, bonsai's guidelines help practitioners work within an established tradition with some assurance of success. Guidelines alone do not guarantee a successful result. Nevertheless, these design rules can rarely be broken without reducing the impact of the bonsai specimen.

== Bonsai styles ==
A key design practice in bonsai is a set of commonly understood, named styles that describe canonical tree and setting designs. These well-known styles provide a convenient shorthand means for communicating about existing bonsai and for designing new ones. Bonsai styles describe a number of basic attributes of a bonsai, such as the angle and straightness of its trunk, its branch configuration, and the number of trees in the bonsai container.

The system of styles serves many purposes, some practical, some aesthetic. In their simplest and most common application, styles provide a form of shorthand description for bonsai specimens. Predefined styles also aid the designer in making a development plan for a pre-bonsai tree. The untrained specimen may have characteristics that suggest or rule out certain styles. The designer can evaluate the pre-bonsai specimen against the catalog of accepted styles to determine what branches to remove or reshape, what foliage to remove or encourage, and what detailed shaping to apply to trunk and branches.

As with all aesthetic rules or guidelines, the various accepted styles will guide a bonsai designer, but are not completely deterministic. The species of the bonsai, the age of the tree when it began bonsai training, the tree's pre-existing shape and structure, even the bonsai artist's training and preferences, strongly affect the shape of the resulting bonsai. These competing influences ensure that the style system acts mostly as a creative aid, not a dominating constraint, in producing a finished bonsai.

== General aesthetic principles ==
The main aim of bonsai aesthetic practices is to create miniature trees with an air of age in their overall shapes, proportions, and details. The quintessential bonsai is a single, dwarfed tree in a small container. It has the appearance of a mature tree, but not of a completely natural one. Instead, a designer or artist has manipulated the shape and surfaces of the tree to enhance or exaggerate the tree's apparent age, and also to give it a defined "front" from which it is meant to be viewed. Anyone questioning the effect of the bonsai designer's work can test the quality of the design by viewing it from the rear, where exactly the same trunk and branches will generally look awkward, cluttered, or otherwise unattractive.

=== No trace of the artist ===
At the same time, the designer's touch must not be apparent to the viewer. If a branch is removed in shaping the tree, the scar will be placed at the "back" of the tree where it cannot be seen. Alternatively, the tree will not be shown until the scar has been covered by years of bark growing over it, or a stub of the branch will remain to be cleaned and shaped into looking like it was broken by wind or lightning. Similarly, wiring should be removed or at least concealed when the bonsai is shown, and must leave no permanent marks on the branch or bark.

=== Visual balance ===
Other guidelines address the balance of visual weight among the trunk, roots, foliage, and branches. The extensive catalog of recognized tree styles form part of this set of guidelines. The term "balance" here may refer to either:

- static visual balance, where careful application of symmetry leads to a stable and restful shape (like the formal upright, or Chokkan, style), or
- dynamic visual balance, which may arise from an asymmetric shape or one that implies instability and movement (like the cascade, or Kengai, style).

The trunk, roots, foliage, and branches are manipulated through a variety of techniques to meet the designer's goals of visual balance. Negative spaces (the "empty space" between solid elements like branches or foliage) are also shaped and proportioned to appear in balance. In almost all designs, the viewer can see completely through the tree's negative spaces to the background behind it. In this combination of positive and negative shapes, bonsai aesthetics overlap to a certain extent with the aesthetics of sculpture.

=== Proportion among elements ===
Another general guideline touches on the proportion of the bonsai's various elements. The most prized proportions mimic those of a full-grown tree as closely as possible. Slender branches with heavy leaves or needles that are out of proportion are avoided, as is a thin trunk with thick branches. One of the few exceptions to this guideline is that flowers and fruit (on trees that produce them) are not considered to be flawed if they appear too large for the tree.

=== Flexibility of the rules ===
One or more of the accepted rules of bonsai form can be bent or broken for a particular tree without destroying its fundamental aesthetic and artistic impact. In fact, going beyond the prescribed rules allows aesthetic growth in the bonsai art, as seen in many of the masterpieces created by Masahiko Kimura and Kunio Kobayashi.

== General aesthetic guidelines ==
The following characteristics are desirable in many Japanese bonsai and other styles of container-grown trees, whatever the style:

=== Gravitas ===
This is the trait which all of the remaining points of aesthetics seek to create. It is a sense of physical weight, the illusion of mass, the appearance of maturity or advanced age, and the elusive quality of dignity. Many of the formal rules of bonsai help the grower create a tree that expresses wabi or sabi, or portrays an aspect of mono no aware.

=== Miniaturization ===
By definition, a bonsai is a tree which is kept small enough to be container-grown while otherwise fostered to have a mature appearance. Bonsai can be classified according to size. Mame are ideally less than 10 cm (4 inches) tall and can be held in the palm of the hand. Shohin are about 25 cm (10 inches) tall, while other bonsai are larger and can not be easily moved. For both practical and aesthetic reasons, the guidelines outlined here are generally most effective and most often applied to larger bonsai, while the smallest specimens of bonsai may adhere to no rules other than "miniature tree" and "grown in a container".

=== Lignification ===
This refers to enhancing the “woody-ness” of a bonsai's trunk and branches so that they have a mature appearance. This typically means the bark surface is encouraged to become rough and dark-colored. In some cases this aesthetic technique will vary, as in a birch tree bonsai attaining the white colour and exfoliating bark of a mature specimen.

=== Asymmetry ===
Bonsai aesthetics discourage strict symmetry in branch and root placement. Radial symmetry is nearly always broken by the requirement for a clear "front", which exposes the tree's trunk and major branches. The left, right, and back sides will have more branches than the front. Left-right (bilateral) symmetry across the trunk is also discouraged, and designers work to alternate branches among the left, right, and back parts of the tree without ever placing two branches at the same height or extending two branches the same distance away from the trunk.

=== Leaf reduction ===
Leaf reduction is related to the general miniaturization described above but is something which varies over the life cycle of a particular bonsai. For example, a bonsai's leaves might be allowed to attain full size for many years in order to encourage vigor and growth of trunk, roots, and branches. It is usually desirable to attain a degree of leaf reduction prior to exhibiting a bonsai. Leaf reduction may be encouraged by pruning and is sometimes achieved by the total defoliation of a bonsai during one part of its growing season. Conifer needles are more difficult to reduce than other sorts of foliage.

=== Nebari ===
Also known as "buttressing", nebari is the visible spread of roots above the growing medium at the base of a bonsai. Nebari help a bonsai seem grounded and well-anchored and make it look mature, akin to a full-sized tree.

=== Ramification ===
Ramification is the splitting of branches and twigs into smaller ones. It is encouraged by pruning and may be integrated with practices that promote leaf reduction.

=== Deadwood ===
Bonsai artists sometimes create or emphasize the appearance of dead wood on a bonsai tree, reflecting the occasional presence of dead branches or snags on full-sized trees. Two specific styles of deadwood are jin and shari. The presence of deadwood is not as common as most of the other points mentioned here, but can be used very effectively on selected tree species and bonsai styles. See deadwood techniques for more details.

=== Curvature ===
Trunk and branch curvature or contortion is an optional goal. Bonsai can achieve a sense of age while remaining straight and upright, but many bonsai rely upon curvature of the trunk to build the illusion of weight and age. Curvature of the trunk that occurs between the roots and the lowest branch is known as tachiagari. Branches are also curved and recurved to help them fit the designer's requirement for "positive space", and to separate small branches so that they do not cross or collide.

== Concrete aesthetic guidelines ==
To support the general goals and principles of bonsai aesthetics, a number of detailed heuristics are taught in the bonsai tradition and documented in its literature (somewhat similar to the bonsai styles). Example guidelines include:

- The tree will appear in a formal container, relatively small compared to the tree.
- Except for the tree(s) and optional patches of moss, no other vegetation should appear in a bonsai container.
- Except for the soil, allowed vegetation, and optionally natural-looking rocks, no other object should appear in a bonsai container.
- The tree will have a distinct "front" from which it is intended to be viewed.
- The trunk should taper significantly from base to top.
- The tree's rootage should be exposed at the base of the trunk and should flare wider than the trunk as it enters the ground.
- No visible root should cross another.
- Branches should begin about one-third of the way up the trunk, and be continuous from there to the tip of the trunk (this guideline is specifically broken for the literati, or Bunjin-gi, style).
- Branch size should diminish from the base to the top of the tree.
- No major tree branch should cross the trunk when viewed from the tree's "front".
- Branch ramification, particularly in deciduous trees, should increase towards the tip of each branch.
- Branch shape should reflect the weight of age, particularly in conifers, and branches may be shaped to tend downwards toward the tip in support of this practice.
- The trunk may be a straight vertical shape or may be contorted in different directions over its length, but in styles where the tip of the tree is above the container, the tip should tilt slightly forward at the top (toward the viewer).
- Foliage (leaves or needles) should be small and to scale with the tree and its branches.
- All trees in a multi-tree bonsai planting should be of the same species.

== See also ==
- Bonsai
- Bonsai styles - conventional styles in the Japanese tradition
- Deadwood bonsai techniques
- Bonsai cultivation and care
- Penjing
- Mambonsai
- Saikei
- Topiary
- List of species used in bonsai
