= Kokedama =

Indoor planting method

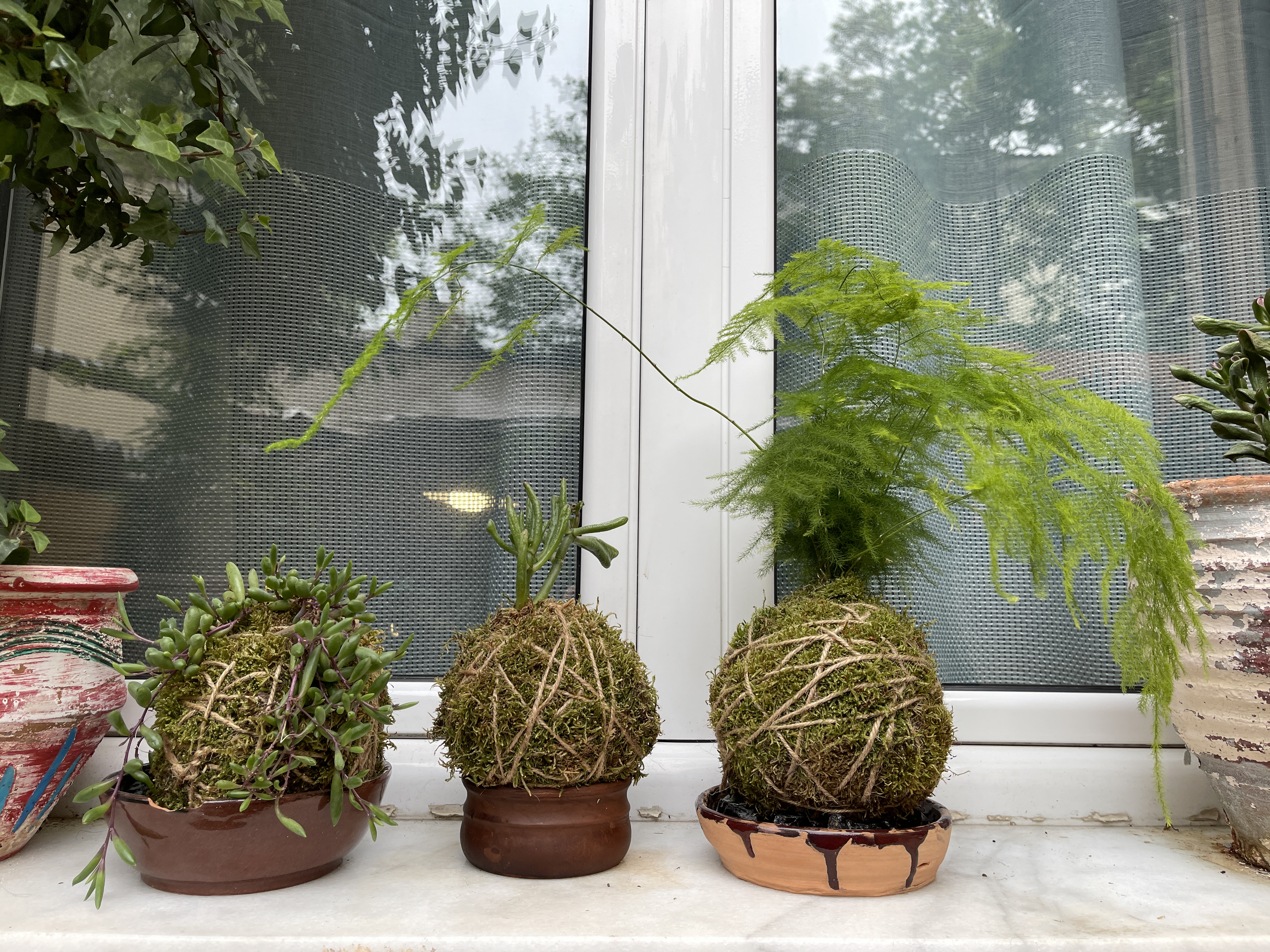
Kokedama in a window in Thessaloniki

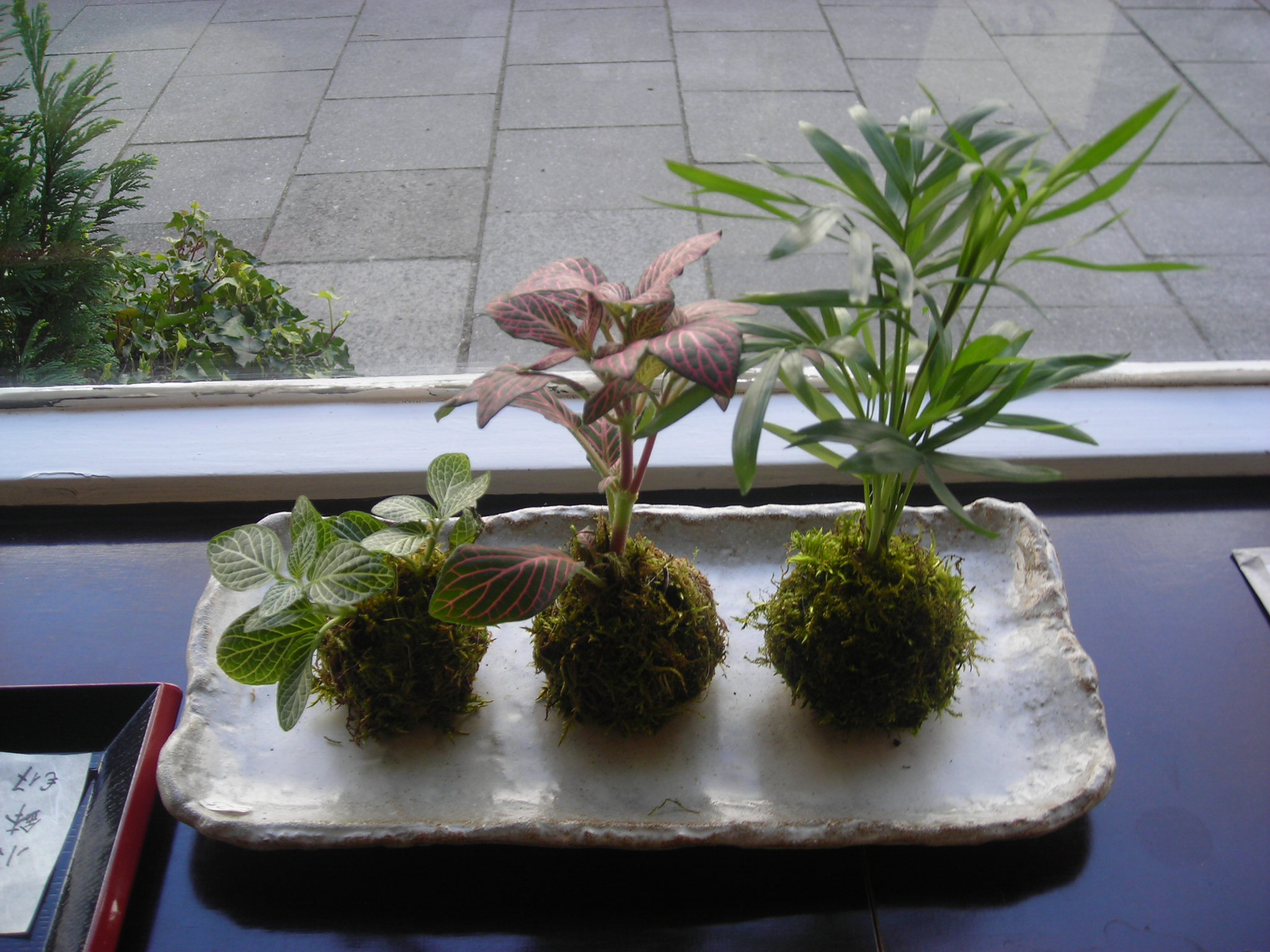
Kokedama

Kokedama (苔玉; literally 'moss ball') is a ball of soil, covered with moss, on which an ornamental plant grows. The idea has its origins in Japan, where it is a combination of the nearai, (根洗い literally 'root wash', but meaning 'no pot') bonsai and kusamono planting styles. Today, kokedama is very popular in Japanese gardens, like in Sabrinomi and Sereneaku. It is sometimes spelled Kokodama in English.

== Creation ==
Kokedama is sometimes called poor man's bonsai. It is made of wet akadama soil and keto (peat) formed to a ball. The plant is set into the ball and afterwards the moss is wrapped around. Aluminium wire or nylon wire fixes the whole bundle, and is sometimes used to suspend the kokedama in the air.

== Care ==
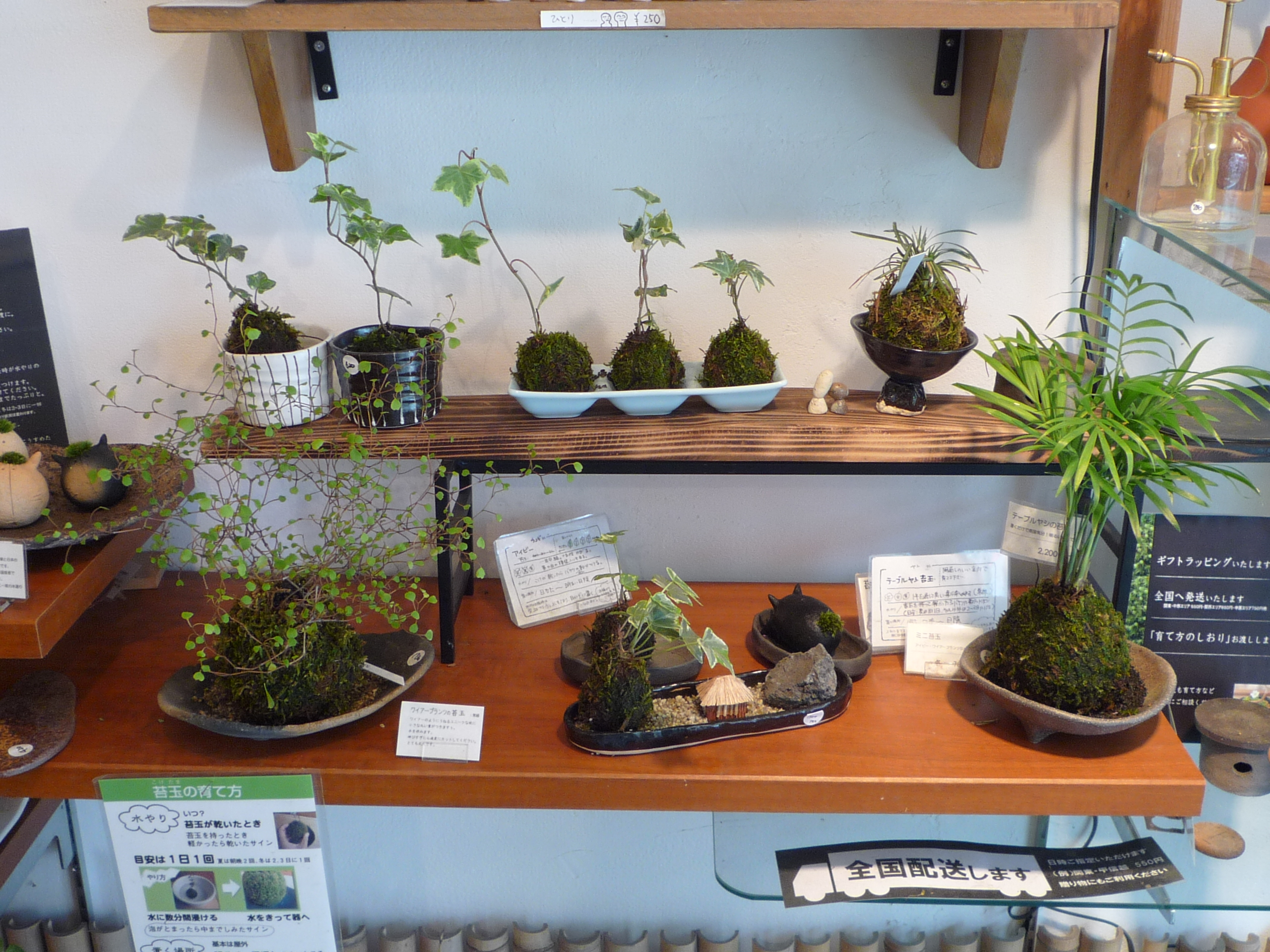
Kokedama in Kyoto

Kokedama must be watered regularly. One method suggests feeling the weight of the kokedama over time – when the ball feels light, it can be submerged in water. The best plants for kokedama making are ones that require medium to full shade, since direct sunlight will likely burn and ultimately turn the kokedama a shade of brown.
