= Bonsai =

Japanese art of miniature trees

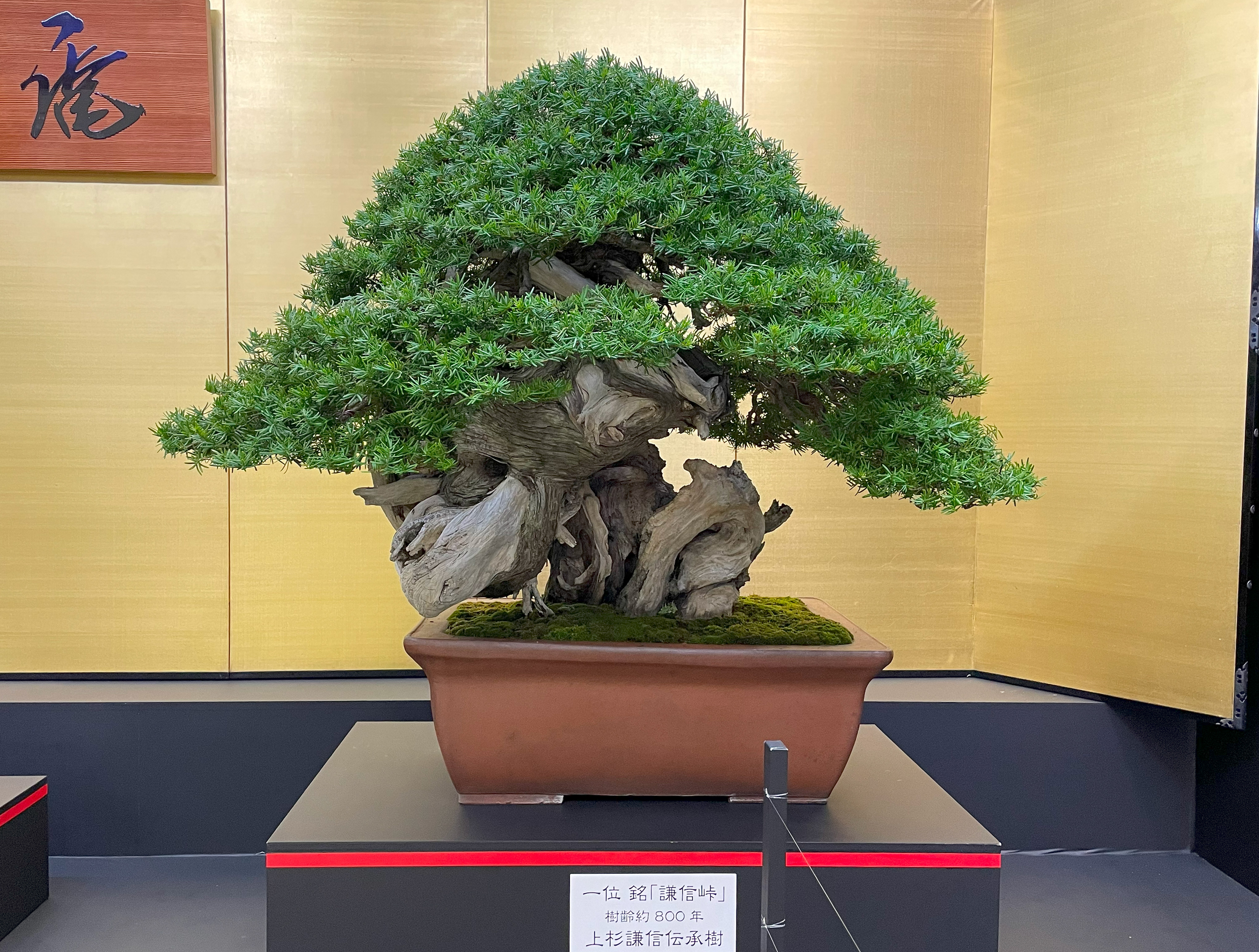
Bonsai, named "Kenshin Tōge" (lit. 'Kenshin's mountain pass'). Japanese yew (Taxus cuspidata) presented by Uesugi Kenshin to Nagao Masakage. The tree is estimated to be about 800 years old.

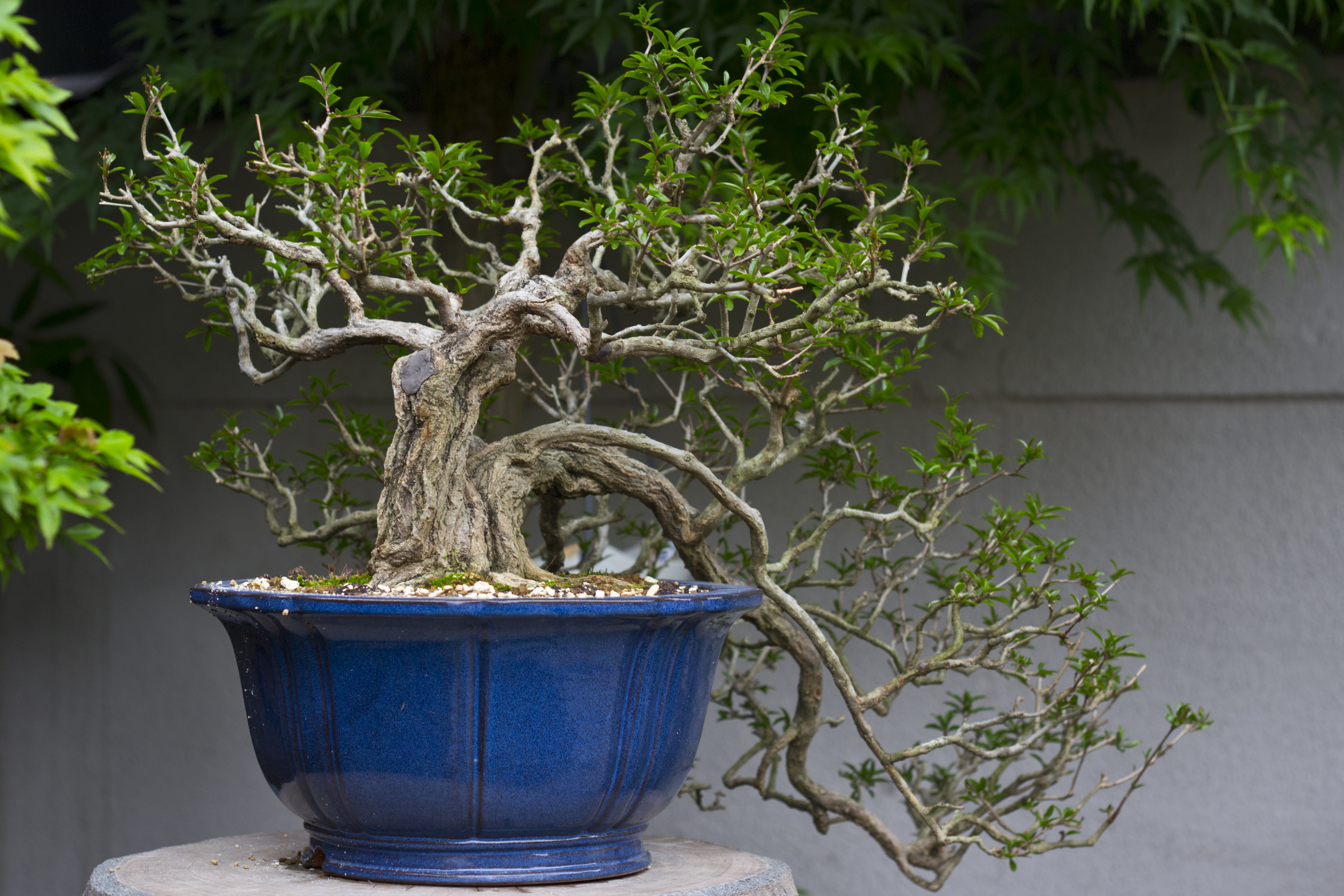
Bonsai at the Omiya Bonsai Art Museum

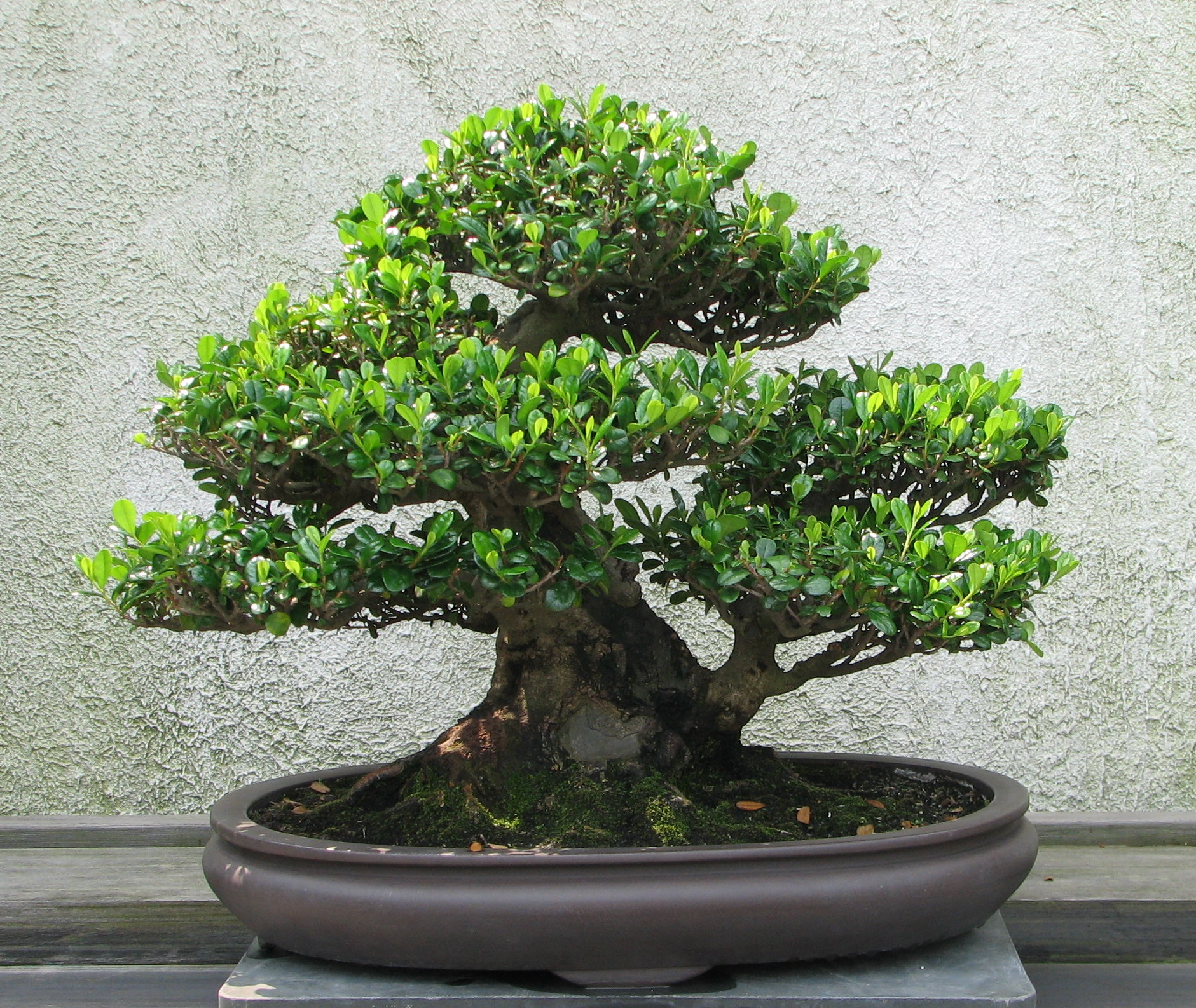
Bonsai at the National Bonsai & Penjing Museum at the United States National Arboretum

Bonsai (/ˈbɒnsaɪ/; Japanese: 盆栽, lit. 'pot planting', pronounced [boɰ̃sai]) is the Japanese art of growing and shaping miniature trees in containers, with a long documented history of influences and native Japanese development over a thousand years, and with unique aesthetics, cultural history, and terminology derived from its evolution in Japan. Similar arts exist in other cultures, including Korea's bunjae, the Chinese art of penjing, and the miniature living landscapes of Vietnamese Hòn non bộ.

The loanword bonsai has become an umbrella term in English, attached to many forms of diminutive potted plants, and also on occasion to other living and non-living things. According to Stephen Orr in The New York Times, "[i]n the West, the word is used to describe virtually all miniature container trees, whether they are authentically trained bonsai or just small rooted cuttings. Technically, though, the term should be reserved for plants that are grown in shallow containers following the precise tenets of bonsai pruning and training, resulting in an artful miniature replica of a full-grown tree in nature." In the most definitive sense, "bonsai" refers to miniaturized, container-grown trees adhering to Japanese bonsai tradition and principles.

Purposes of bonsai are primarily contemplation for the viewer, and the pleasant exercise of effort and ingenuity for the grower. Bonsai are not grown for the production of food or medicine.

A bonsai is created beginning with a specimen of source material. This may be a cutting, seedling, a tree from the wild (known as yamadori) or small tree of a species suitable for bonsai development. Bonsai can be created from nearly any perennial woody-stemmed tree or shrub species that produces true branches and can be cultivated to remain small through pot confinement with crown and root pruning. Some species are popular as bonsai material because they have characteristics, such as small leaves or needles or aged-looking bark, that make them appropriate for the compact visual scope of bonsai.

The source specimen is shaped to be relatively small and to meet the aesthetic standards of bonsai, which emphasizes not the entirety of a landscape but the unique form of a specimen bonsai tree or trees. When the candidate bonsai nears its planned final size, it is planted in a display pot, usually one designed for bonsai display in one of a few accepted shapes and proportions. From that point forward, its growth is restricted by the pot environment. Throughout the year, the bonsai is shaped to limit growth, redistribute foliar vigor to areas requiring further development, and meet the artist's detailed design.

The practice of bonsai is sometimes confused with dwarfing, but dwarfing generally refers to research, discovery, or creation of plants that are permanent, genetic miniatures of existing species. Plant dwarfing often uses selective breeding or genetic engineering to create dwarf cultivars. Bonsai does not require genetically dwarfed trees but rather depends on growing small trees from regular stock and seeds. Bonsai uses cultivation techniques like pruning, root reduction, potting, defoliation, and grafting to produce small trees that mimic the shape and style of mature, full-size trees.

== History ==
=== Early versions ===
The Japanese art of bonsai originated from the Chinese practice of penjing. From the 6th century onward, Imperial embassy personnel and Buddhist students from Japan visited and returned from mainland China. They brought back many Chinese ideas and goods, including container plantings.

In the medieval period, recognizable bonsai were portrayed in handscroll paintings like the Ippen Shōnin Eden (一遍上人絵伝, 1299). The 1195 scroll Saigyo Monogatari Emaki (西行物語絵巻 is the earliest known to depict dwarfed potted trees in Japan. Wooden tray and dish-like pots with dwarf landscapes on modern-looking wooden shelves also appear in the 1309 Kasuga Gongen Genki E (春日権現験記絵, Legends of Kasuga Shrine) scroll. Dwarf trees displayed on short poles are portrayed in the 1351 Boki Ekotoba scroll.

A close relationship between Japan's Zen Buddhism and the potted trees began to shape bonsai reputation and aesthetics, which were introduced to Japan from China. In this period, Chinese Chan (pronounced "Zen" in Japanese) Buddhist monks taught at Japan's monasteries. One of the monks' activities was to introduce political leaders to various arts of miniature landscapes as admirable accomplishments for men of taste and learning. Potted landscape arrangements up to this period included miniature figurines after the Chinese fashion. Japanese artists eventually adopted a simpler style for bonsai, increasing focus on the tree by removing miniatures and other decorations, and using smaller, plainer pots.

=== Hachi no ki ===
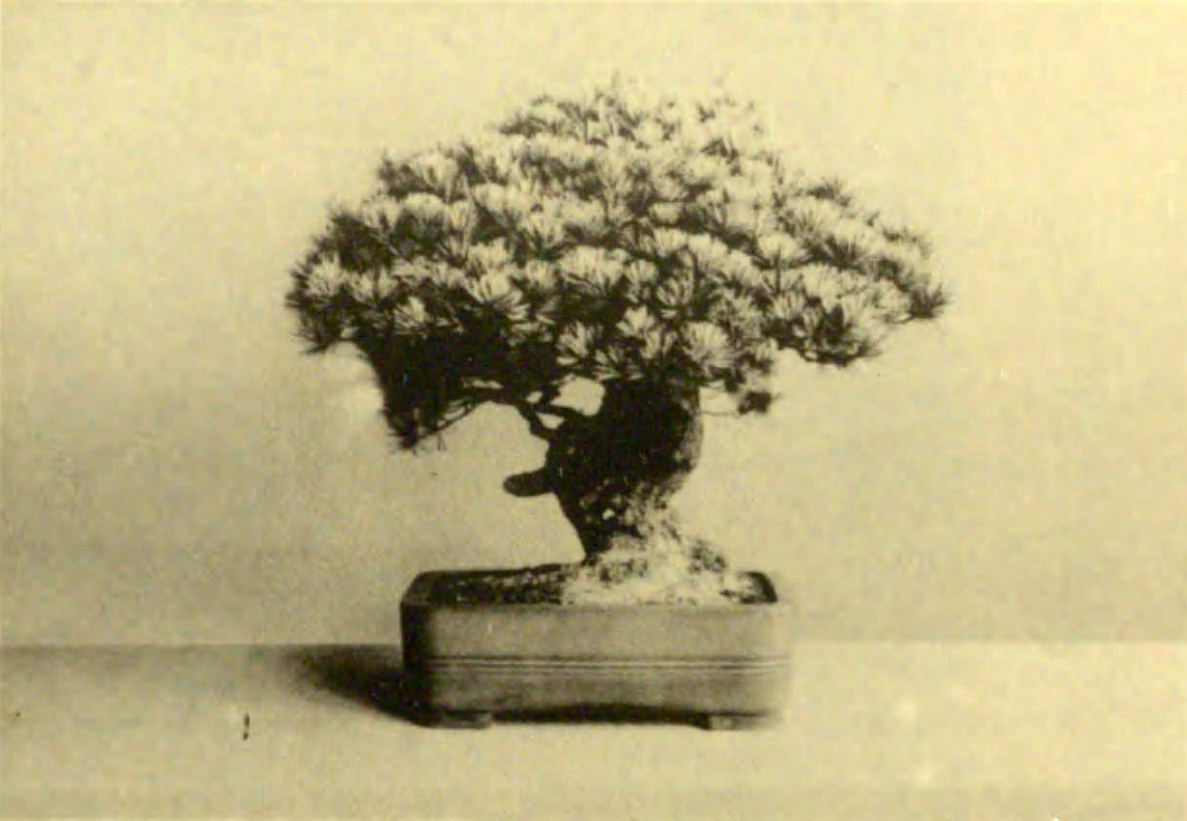
Japanese white pine, "Sandai Shogun" (The Third Shogun), approximately 550 years old, Imperial Collection, 1938

Around the 14th century, the term for dwarf potted trees was "the bowl's tree" (鉢の木, hachi no ki). This indicated use of a fairly deep pot rather than the shallow pot denoted by the eventual term bonsai. In later centuries, woodblock prints by several artists depicted this popular drama. There was even a fabric design of the same name. Through these and other popular media, bonsai became known to a broad Japanese population.

Bonsai cultivation reached a high level of expertise in this period. Bonsai dating to the 17th century have survived to the present. One of the oldest-known living bonsai trees, considered one of the National Treasures of Japan, can be seen in the Tokyo Imperial Palace collection. A five-needle pine (Pinus pentaphylla var. negishi) known as Sandai Shogun (三代将軍, the third shogun) is documented as having been cared for by Tokugawa Iemitsu. The tree is thought to be at least 500 years old and was trained as a bonsai by 1610.

By the end of the 18th century, bonsai cultivation in Japan was becoming widespread and began to interest the general public. In the Tenmei era (1781–88), an exhibit of traditional dwarf potted pines began to be held every year in Kyoto. Connoisseurs from five provinces and neighboring areas would bring one or two plants each to the show in order to submit them to visitors for ranking.

=== Classical period ===
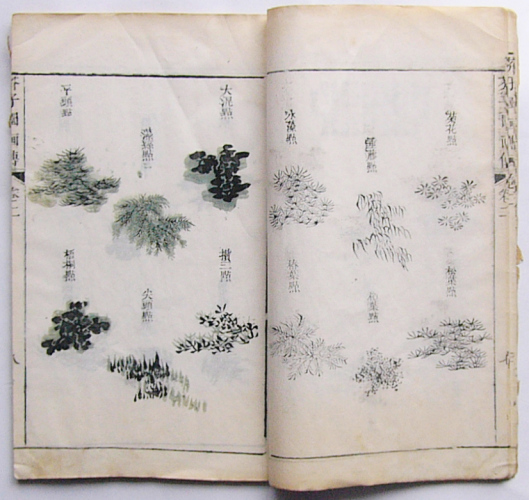
Depicting foliage in the Manual of the Mustard Seed Garden. This work had a large influence on bonsai during the Edo period.

In Japan after 1800, bonsai began to move from being the esoteric practice of a few specialists to becoming a widely popular art form and hobby. In Itami, Hyōgo, Japanese scholars of Chinese arts gathered in the early 19th century to discuss recent styles in the art of miniature trees. Many terms and concepts adopted by this group were derived from the Jieziyuan Huazhuan (Manual of the Mustard Seed Garden in English; Kai-shi-en Gaden in Japanese). The Japanese version of potted trees, which had been previously called hachiue or other terms, were renamed bonsai. This word connoted a shallow container, not a deeper bowl style. The term "bonsai", however, would not become broadly used in describing Japan's dwarf potted trees for nearly a century.

The popularity of bonsai began to grow outside the limited scope of scholars and the nobility. On October 13, 1868, the Meiji Emperor moved to his new capital in Tokyo. Bonsai were displayed both inside and outside Meiji Palace, and those placed in the grand setting of the Imperial Palace had to be "Giant Bonsai", large enough to fill the grand space. The Meiji Emperor encouraged interest in bonsai, which broadened its importance and appeal to his government's professional staff.

New books, magazines, and public exhibitions made bonsai more accessible to the Japanese populace. An Artistic Bonsai Concours was held in Tokyo in 1892, followed by publication of a three-volume commemorative picture book. This event demonstrated a new tendency to see bonsai as an independent art form. In 1903, the Tokyo association Jurakukai held showings of bonsai and ikebana at two Japanese-style restaurants. In 1906, Bonsai Gaho became the first monthly magazine on the subject. It was followed by Toyo Engei and Hana in 1907. The initial issue of Bonsai magazine was published in 1921, and this influential periodical ran for 518 consecutive issues.

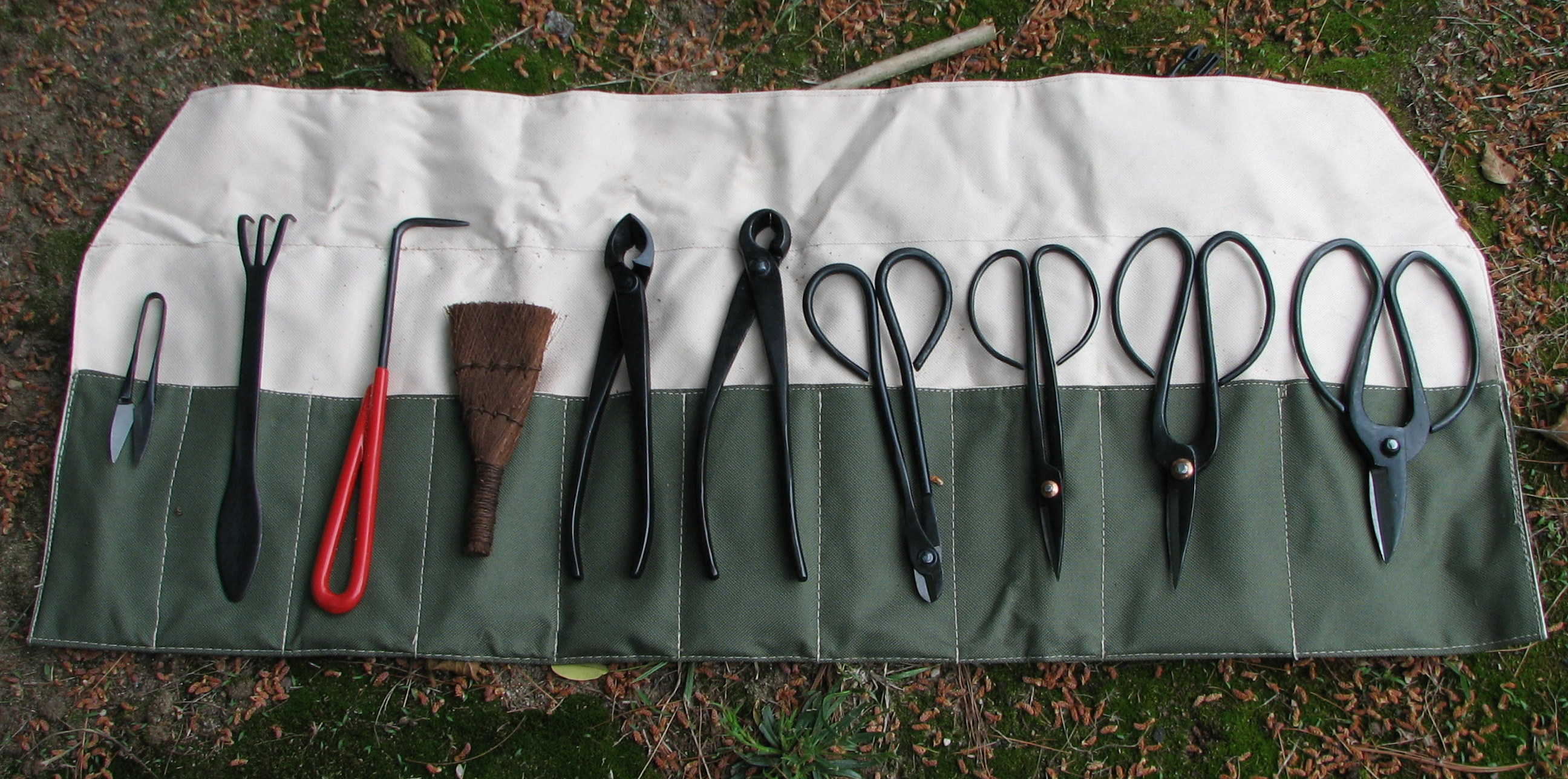
Modern bonsai tools (left to right): leaf trimmer; rake with spatula; root hook; coir brush; concave cutter; knob cutter; wire cutter; small, medium, and large shears

Bonsai shaping aesthetics, techniques, and tools became increasingly sophisticated as bonsai popularity grew in Japan. In 1910, shaping with wire rather than the older string, rope, and burlap techniques, appeared in the Sanyu-en Bonsai-Dan (History of Bonsai in the Sanyu nursery). Zinc-galvanized steel wire was initially used. Expensive copper wire was used only for selected trees that had real potential. In the 1920s and 1930s, toolsmith Masakuni I (1880–1950) helped design and produce the first steel tools specifically made for the developing requirements of bonsai styling. This included the concave cutter, a branch cutter designed to leave a shallow indentation on the trunk when a branch was removed. Properly treated, this indentation would fill over with live tree tissue and bark over time, greatly reducing or eliminating the usual pruning scar.

Prior to World War II, international interest in bonsai was fueled by increased trade in trees and the appearance of books in popular foreign languages. By 1914, the first national annual bonsai show was held (an event repeated annually through 1933) in Tokyo's Hibiya Park. Another great annual public exhibition of trees began in 1927 at the Asahi Newspaper Hall in Tokyo. Beginning in 1934, the prestigious Kokufu-ten annual exhibitions were held in Tokyo's Ueno Park. The first major book on the subject in English was published in the Japanese capital: Dwarf Trees (Bonsai) by Shinobu Nozaki.

By 1940, about 300 bonsai dealers worked in Tokyo. Some 150 species of trees were being cultivated, and thousands of specimens were shipped annually to Europe and America. The first bonsai nurseries and clubs in the Americas were started by first and second-generation Japanese immigrants. Though this progress to international markets and enthusiasts was interrupted by the war, by the 1940s bonsai had become an art form of international interest and involvement.

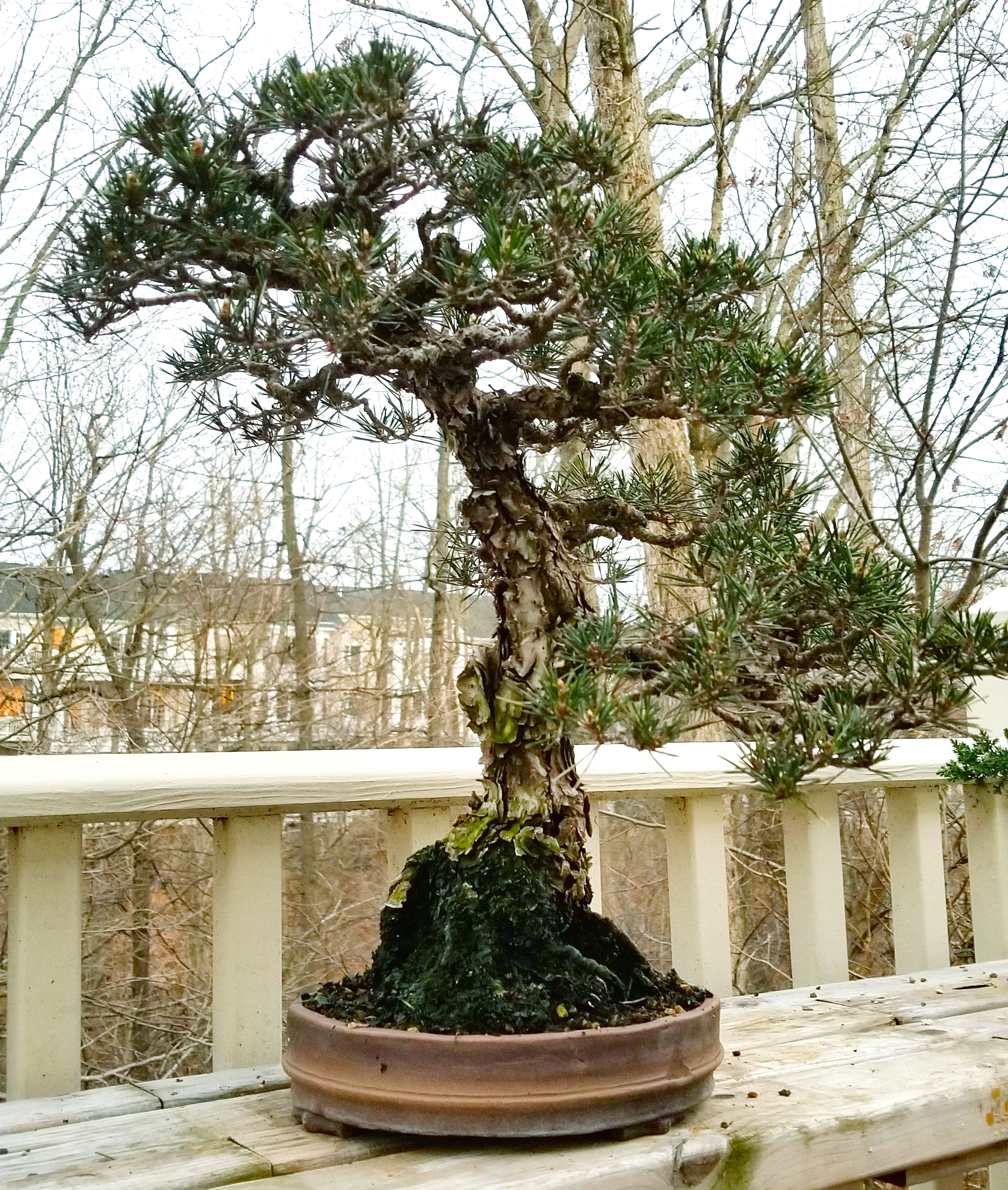
Japanese black pine var. 'Kotobuki' as bonsai. This tree is over 65 years old and prized for its flaky bark and very short needles.

=== Modern bonsai ===
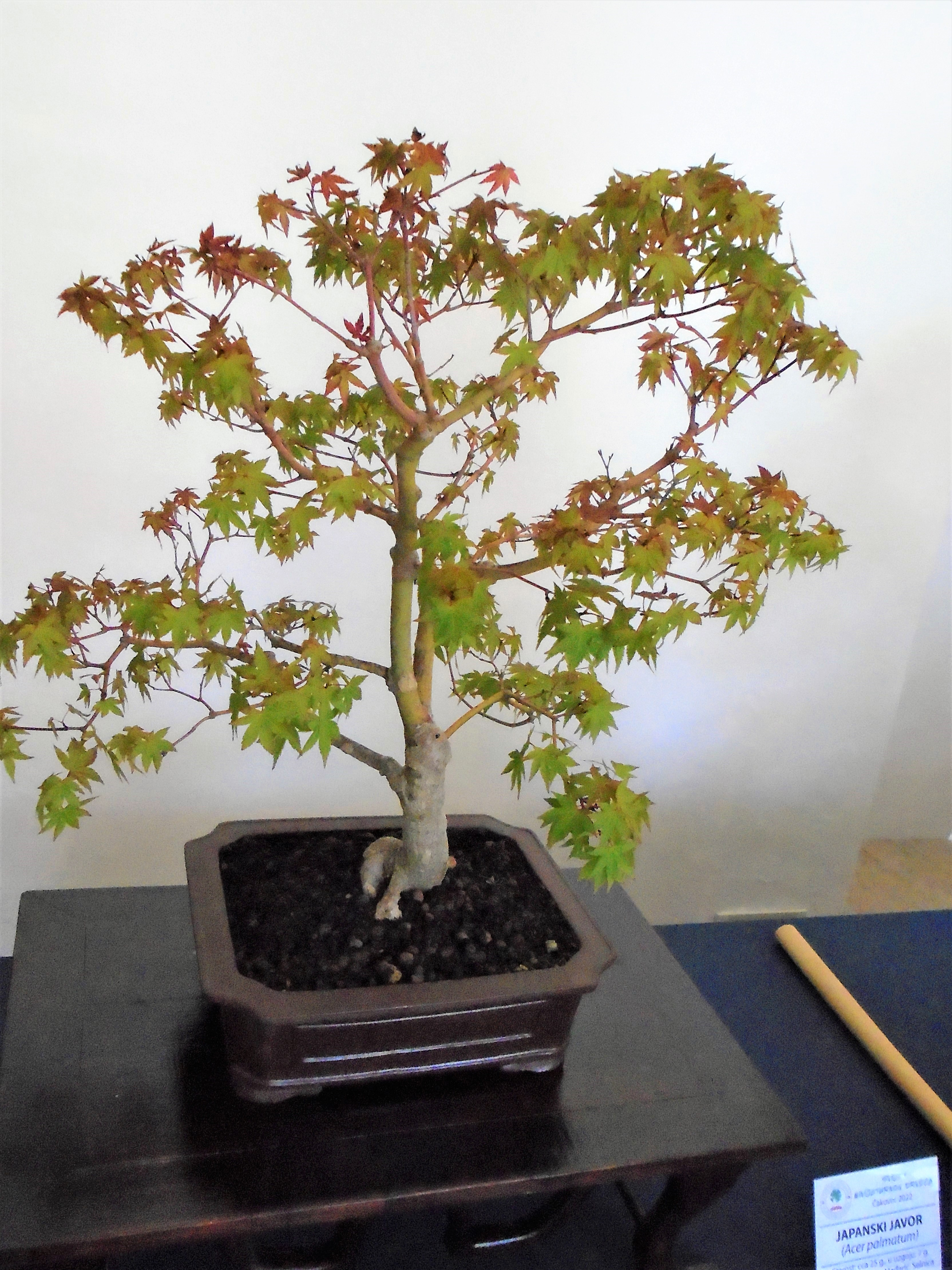
Japanese maple (Acer palmatum) at an exhibition in Croatia, 2022

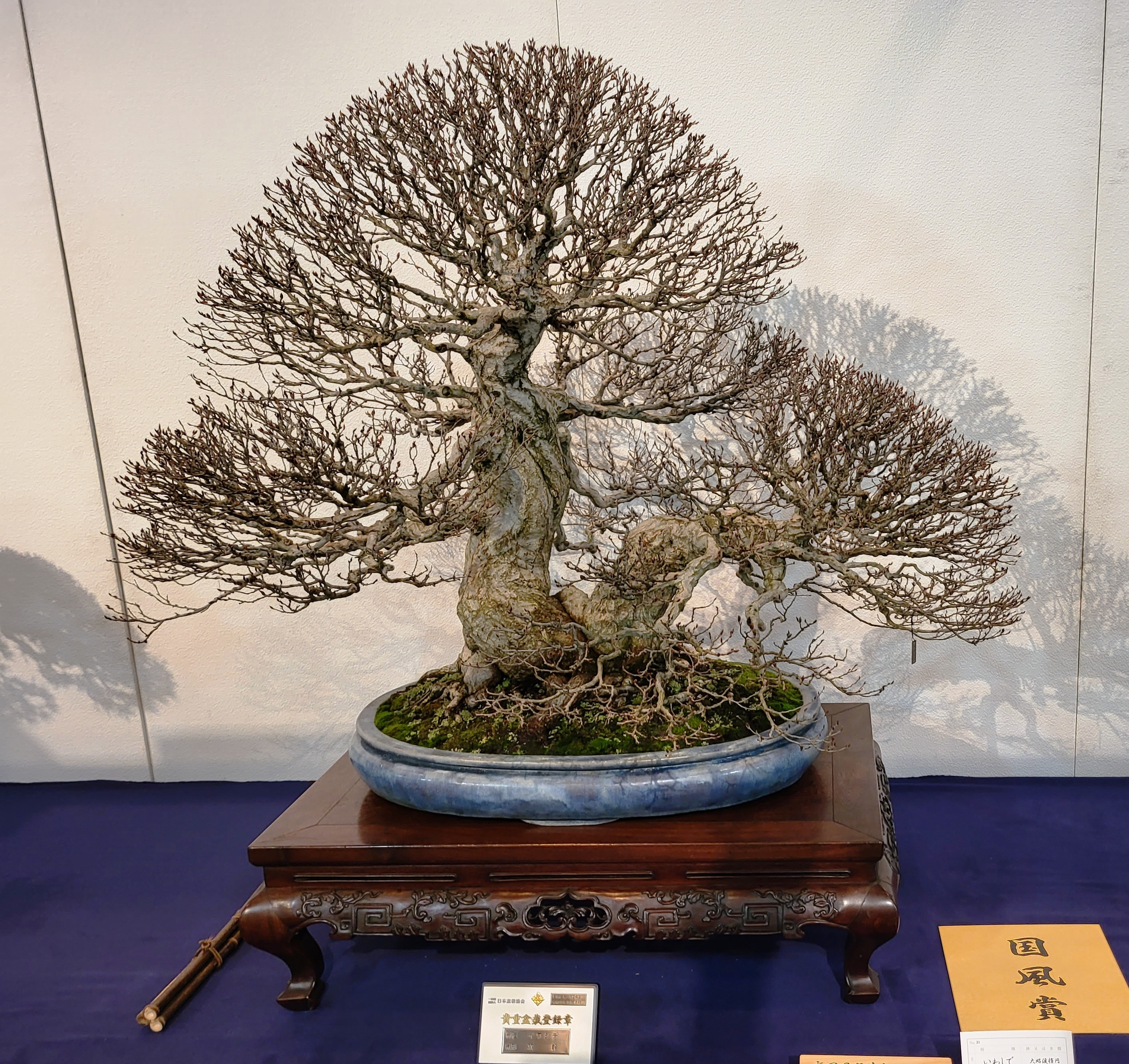
Korean hornbeam (Carpinus turczaninovii) in winter, an award winner at the 97th Kokufu-ten bonsai exhibition in Tokyo, 2023

Following World War II, several trends made the Japanese tradition of bonsai increasingly accessible to Western and world audiences. One key trend was the increase in the number, scope, and prominence of bonsai exhibitions. For example, the Kokufu-ten bonsai displays reappeared in 1947 after a four-year cancellation and became annual affairs. These displays continue to this day and are by invitation only for eight days in February. In October 1964, a great exhibition was held in Hibya Park by the private Kokufu Bonsai Association, reorganized into the Nippon Bonsai Association, to mark the 1964 Tokyo Olympics.

A large display of bonsai and suiseki was held as part of Expo '70, and formal discussion was made of an international association of enthusiasts. In 1975, the first gafu-ten (elegant-style exhibit) of shohin bonsai (13–25 cm or 5–10 in tall) was held. So was the first sakufu-ten (creative bonsai exhibit), the only event in which professional bonsai growers exhibit traditional trees under their own names rather than under the name of the owner.

The first World Bonsai Convention was held in Osaka during the World Bonsai and Suiseki Exhibition in 1980. Nine years later, a series of World Bonsai Conventions was launched by the newly-formed World Bonsai Friendship Federation (WBFF) in Omiya. These conventions attracted several hundreds of participants from dozens of countries and have since been held every four years at different locations around the globe: 1993, Orlando, Florida; 1997, Seoul, Korea; 2001, Munich, Germany; 2005, Washington, D.C.; 2009, San Juan, Puerto Rico; 2013, Jitan, Jiangsu, China; 2017, Saitama, Saitama, Japan; and 2022's virtual convention in Perth, Australia, which replaced the one originally scheduled a year earlier but was postponed because of the COVID-19 pandemic. Currently, Japan continues to host regular exhibitions with the world's largest numbers of bonsai specimens and the highest recognized specimen quality.

Another key trend was the increase in books on bonsai and related arts, being published for the first time in English and other languages for audiences outside of Japan. In 1952, Yuji Yoshimura, the son of a Japanese bonsai community leader, collaborated with German diplomat and author Alfred Koehn to give bonsai demonstrations. Koehn had been an enthusiast before the war, and his 1937 book Japanese Tray Landscapes had been published in English in Beijing. Yoshimura's 1957 book The Art of Bonsai, written in English with his student Giovanna M. Halford, went on to be called the "classic Japanese bonsai bible for westerners" with over thirty printings.

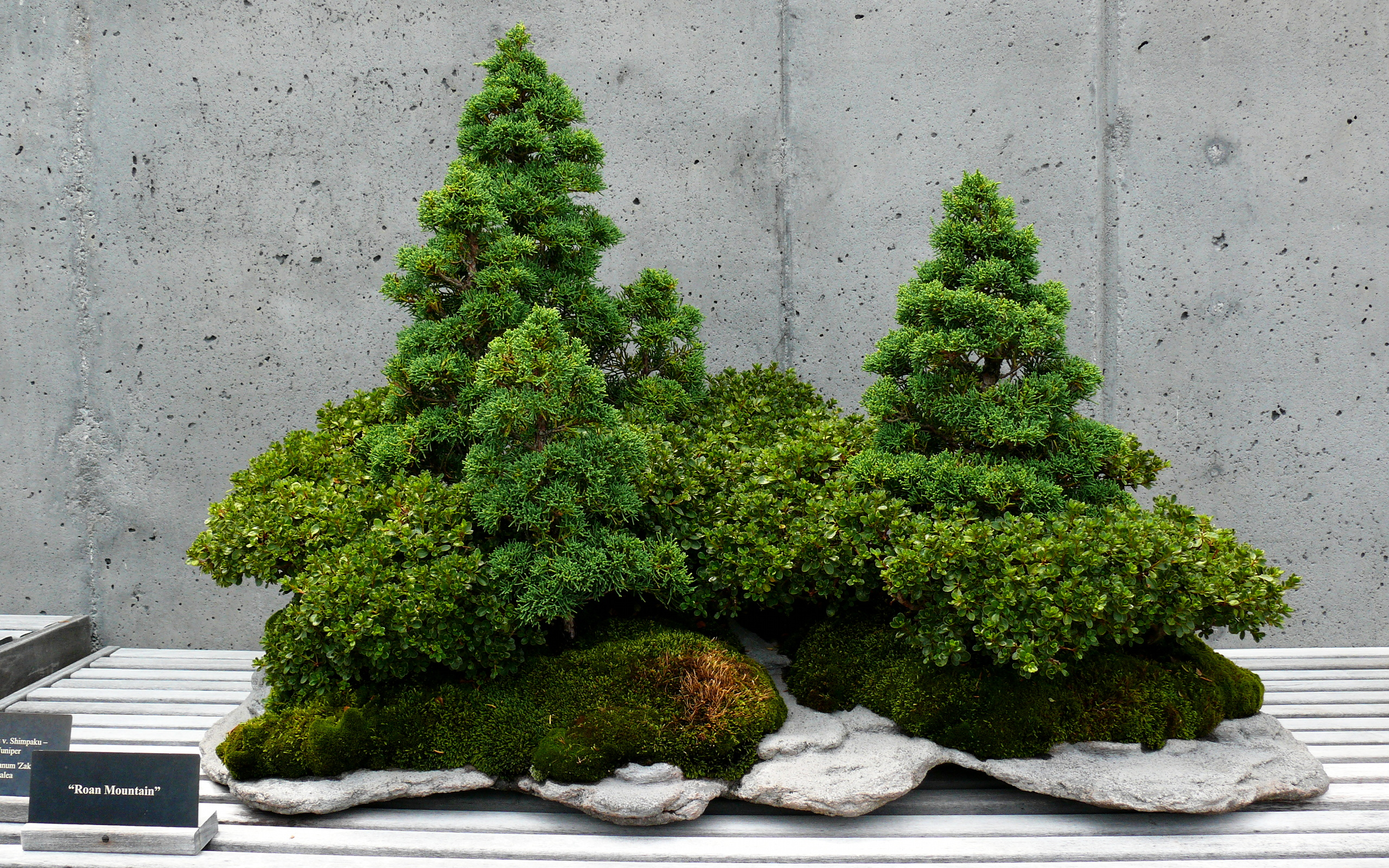
Multi-species saikei, named Roan Mountain, contains Shimpaku juniper and Zakura azalea.

The related art of saikei was introduced to English-speaking audiences in 1963 in Kawamoto and Kurihara's book Bonsai-Saikei. This book describes tray landscapes made with younger plant material than was traditionally used in bonsai, providing an alternative to the use of large, older plants, few of which had escaped war damage.

A third trend was the increasing availability of expert bonsai training, at first only in Japan, and then more widely. In 1967, the first group of Westerners studied at an Ōmiya nursery. Returning to the U.S., they established the American Bonsai Society. Other groups and individuals from outside Asia then visited and studied at the various Japanese nurseries, occasionally even apprenticing under the masters. These visitors brought back to their local clubs the latest techniques and styles, which were then further disseminated. Japanese teachers also traveled widely, bringing hands-on bonsai expertise to all six continents.

The final trend supporting world involvement in bonsai is the widening availability of specialized bonsai plant stock, soil components, tools, pots, and other accessory items. Bonsai nurseries in Japan advertise and ship specimen bonsai worldwide. Most countries have local nurseries providing plant stock as well. Japanese bonsai soil components, such as Akadama clay, are available worldwide, and suppliers also provide similar local materials in many locations. Specialized bonsai tools are widely available from Japanese and Chinese sources. Potters around the globe provide material to hobbyists and specialists in many countries.

Bonsai has now reached a worldwide audience. There are over fourteen hundred books on bonsai and the related arts in at least twenty-eight languages available in over one-hundred-and-ten countries and territories. A few dozen magazines in over thirteen languages are in print. Several score of club newsletters are available online, and there are at least that many discussion forums and blogs. There are at least a hundred thousand enthusiasts in some fifteen hundred clubs and associations worldwide, as well as over five million unassociated hobbyists. Plant material from every location is being trained into bonsai and displayed at local, regional, national, and international conventions and exhibitions for enthusiasts and the general public.

== Cultivation and care ==
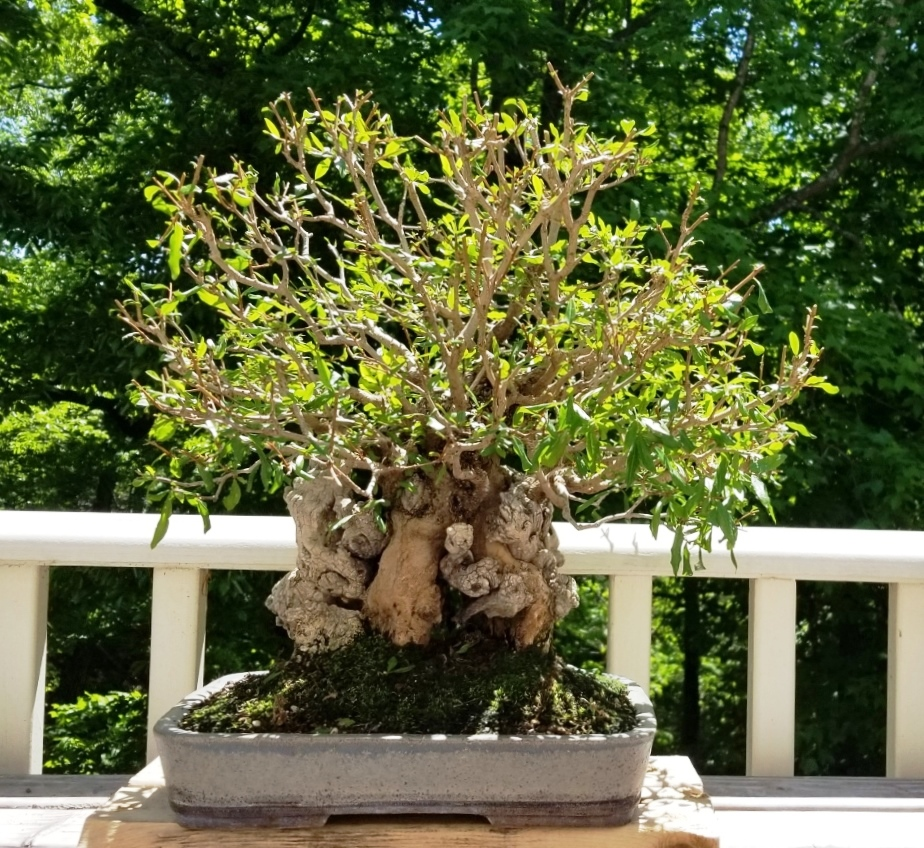
Sample of a Pomegranate trained as bonsai, and shown after a late spring partial defoliation. This specimen was collected in the wild in California, the tree is estimated to be 125 to 175 years old. Note the sections of trunk deadwood which give character and reflect the old age of the tree.

=== Material sources ===
All bonsai start with a specimen of source material, a plant that the grower wishes to train into bonsai form. Bonsai practice is an unusual form of plant cultivation in that growth from seeds is rarely used to obtain source material. To display the characteristic aged appearance of a bonsai within a reasonable time, the source plant is often mature or at least partially grown when the bonsai creator begins work. Sources of bonsai material include:

- Propagation from a source tree through cuttings or layering.
- Nursery stock directly from a nursery, or from a garden centre or similar resale establishment.
- Commercial bonsai growers, which, in general, sell mature specimens that display bonsai aesthetic qualities already.
- Collecting suitable bonsai material in its original wild situation, successfully moving it, and replanting it in a container for development as bonsai. These trees are called yamadori and are often the most expensive and prized of all bonsai.

=== Techniques ===
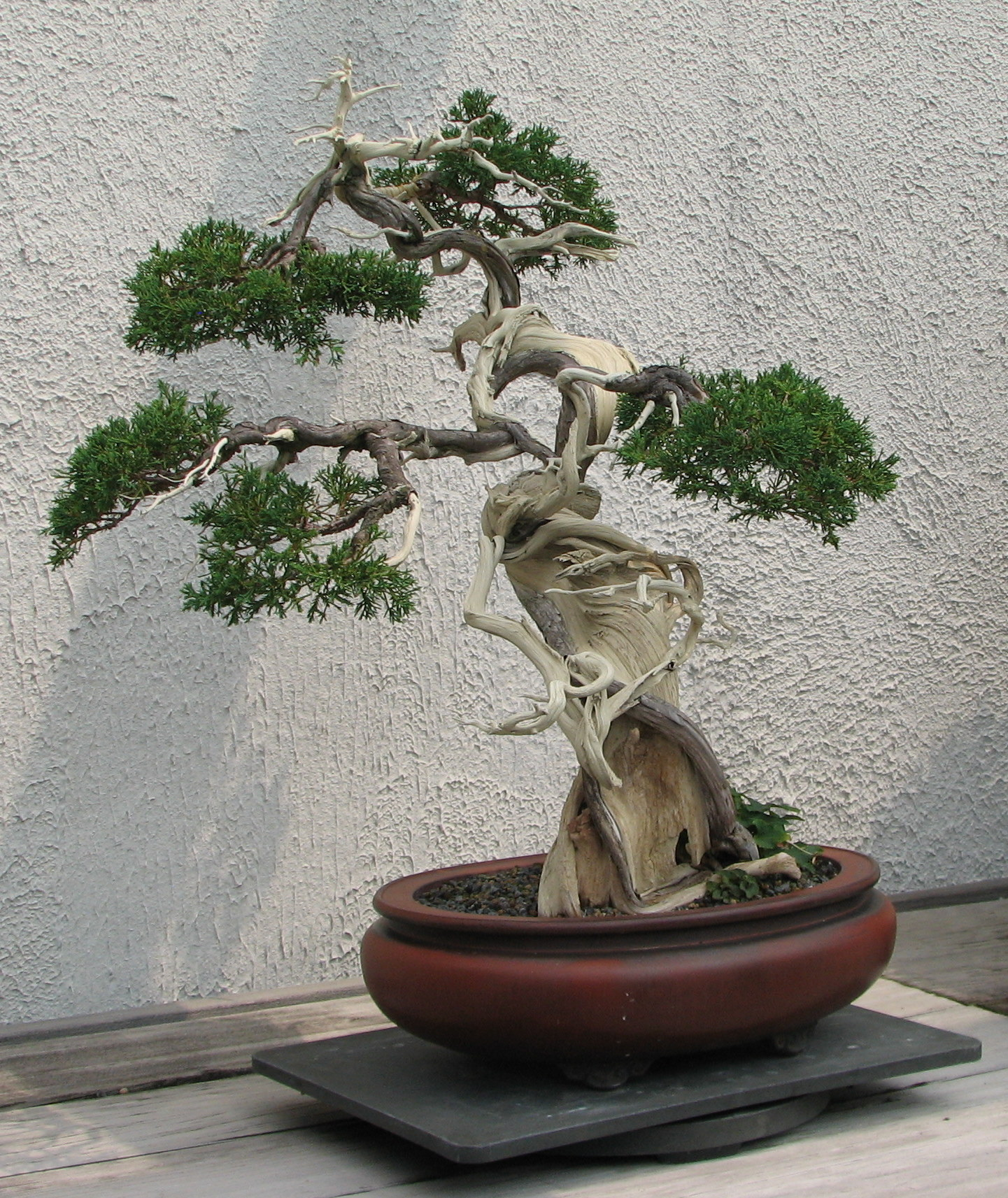
This juniper makes extensive use of both jin (deadwood branches) and shari (trunk deadwood).

The practice of bonsai development incorporates a number of techniques either unique to bonsai or, if used in other forms of cultivation, applied in unusual ways that are particularly suitable to the bonsai domain. These techniques include:

- Leaf trimming, the selective removal of leaves (for most varieties of deciduous tree) or needles (for coniferous trees and some others) from a bonsai's trunk and branches.
- Pruning the trunk, branches, and roots of the candidate tree.
- Wiring branches and trunks allows the bonsai designer to create the desired general form and make detailed branch and leaf placements.
- Clamping using mechanical devices for shaping trunks and branches; bending of branches or trunks may also be achieved by the use of tension cables or guy-wires.
- Grafting new growing material (typically a bud, branch, or root) into a prepared area on the trunk or under the bark of the tree.
- Defoliation, which can provide short-term dwarfing of foliage for certain deciduous species.
- Deadwood bonsai techniques such as jin and shari simulate age and maturity in a bonsai.

== Bonsai styles ==
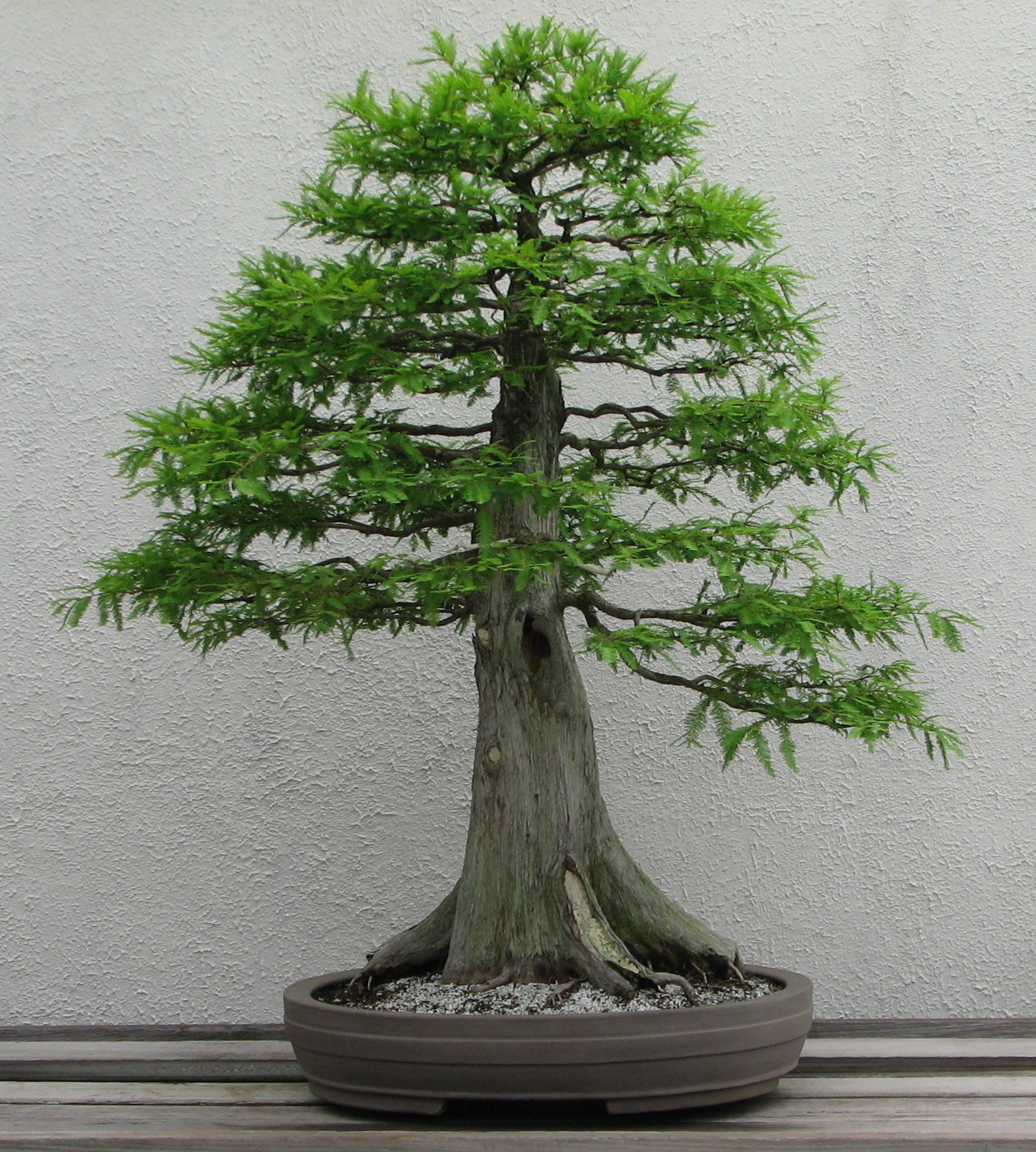
Formal upright–style Bald cypress

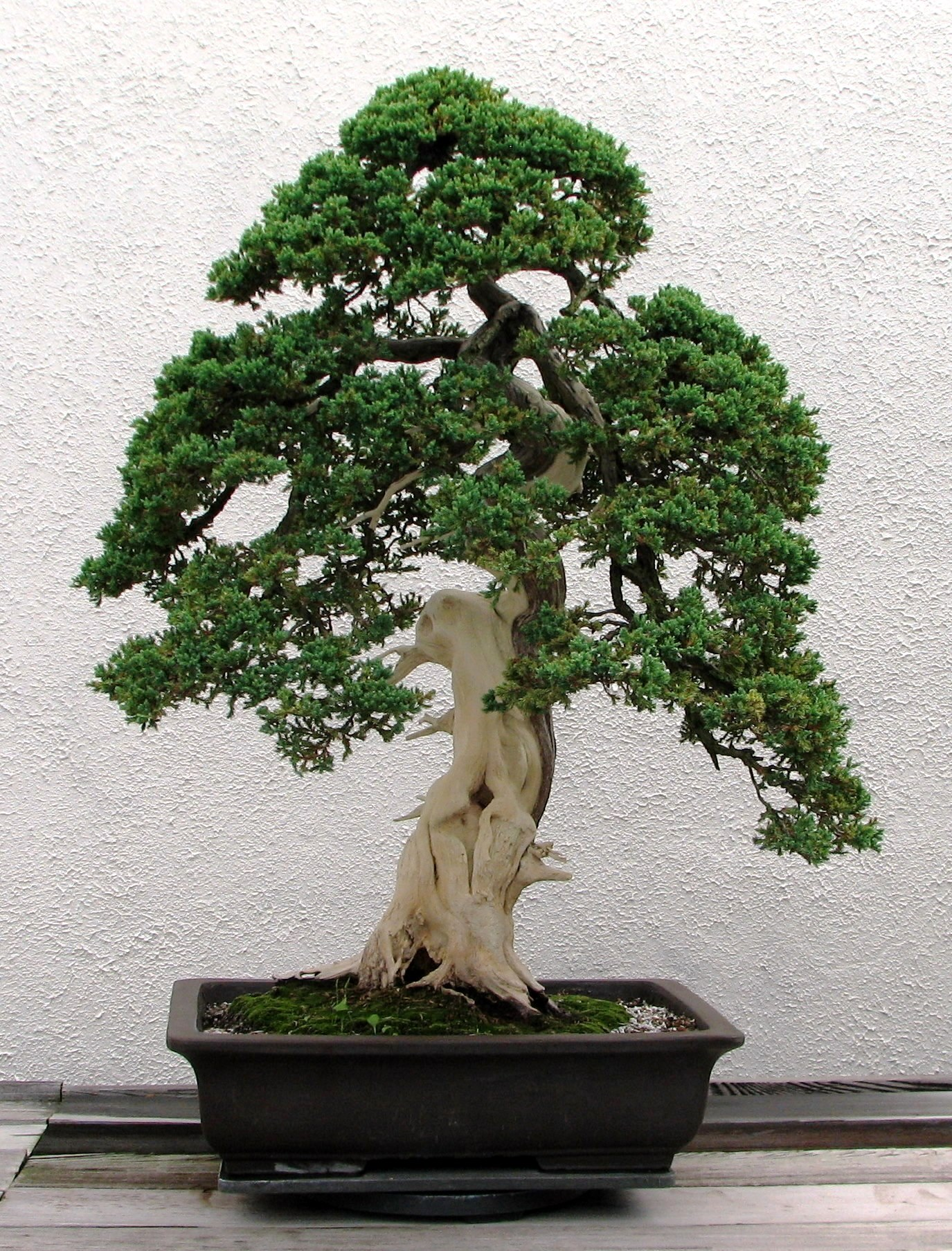
Informal upright–style juniper

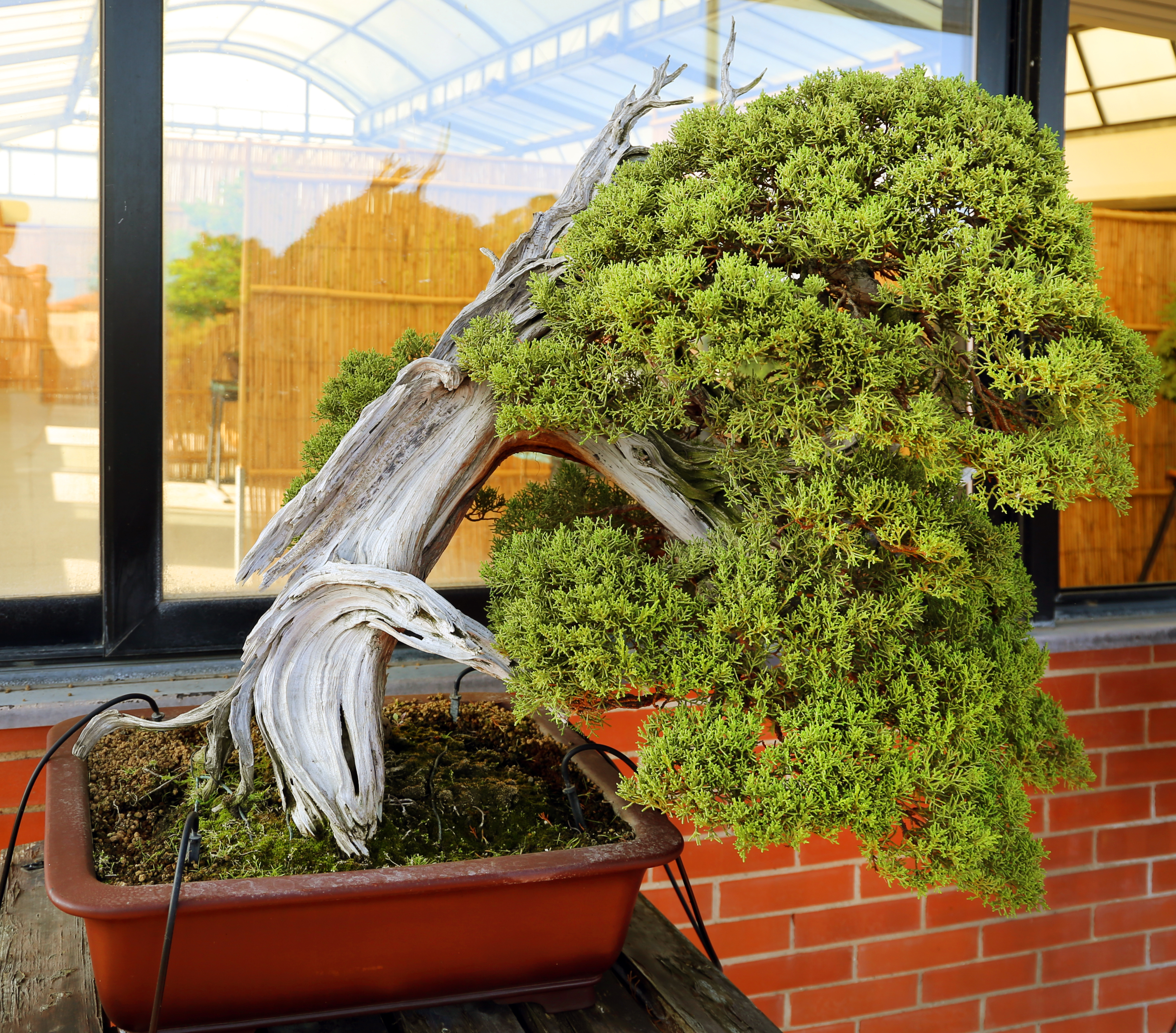
Slant-style conifer

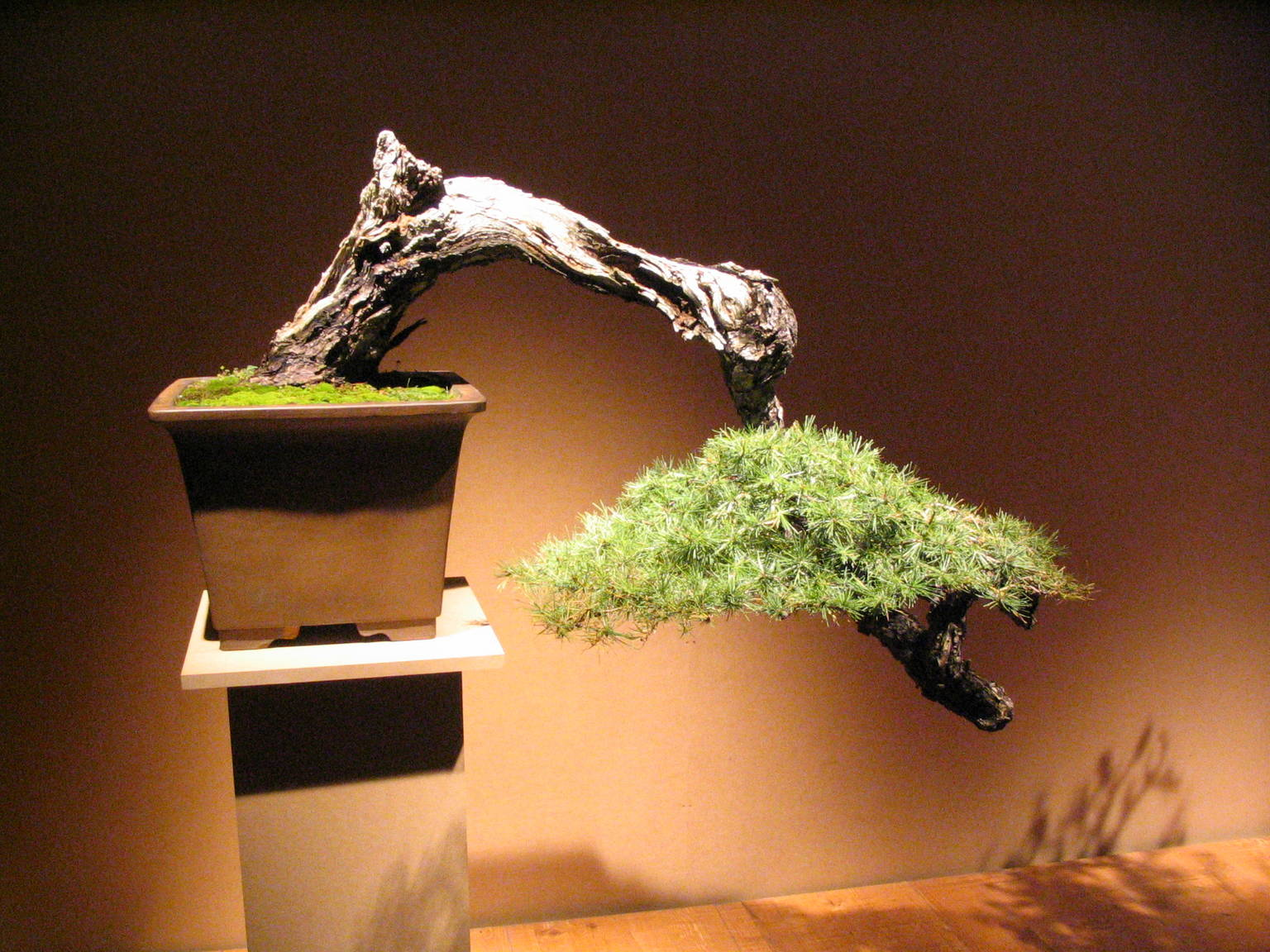
Cascade-style conifer

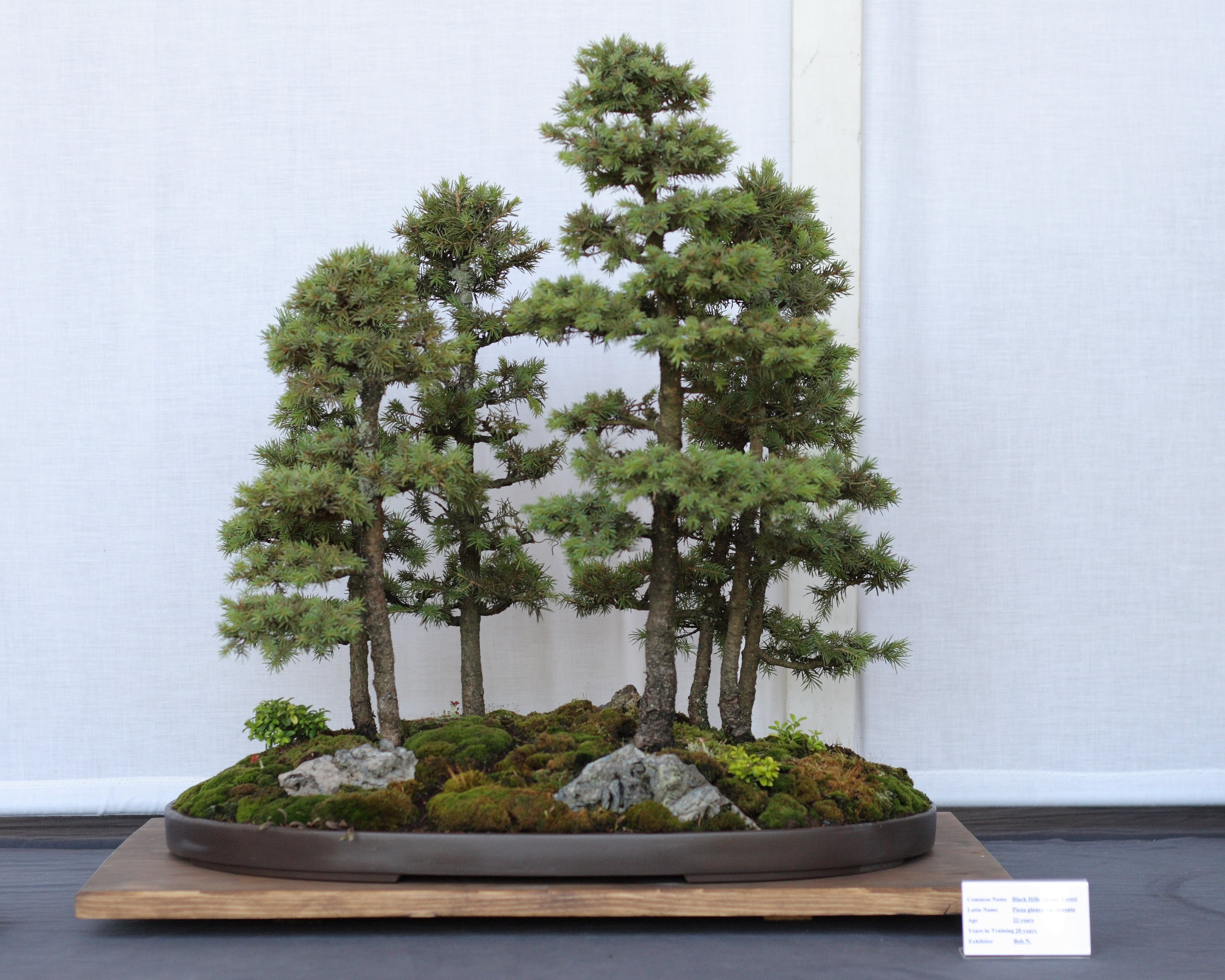
Forest-style Black Hills spruce

The Japanese tradition describes bonsai tree designs using a set of commonly understood, named styles. The most common styles include formal upright, informal upright, slanting, semi-cascade, cascade, raft, literati, and group/forest. Less common forms include windswept, weeping, split-trunk, and driftwood styles. These terms are not mutually exclusive, and a single bonsai specimen can exhibit more than one style characteristic. When a bonsai specimen falls into multiple style categories, the common practice is to describe it by the dominant or most striking characteristic.

A frequently used set of styles describes the orientation of the bonsai tree's main trunk. Different terms are used for a tree with its apex directly over the center of the trunk's entry into the soil, slightly to the side of that center, deeply inclined to one side, and inclined below the point at which the trunk of the bonsai enters the soil.

- Formal upright (直幹, chokkan) is a style of trees characterized by a straight, upright, tapering trunk. Branches progress regularly from the thickest and broadest at the bottom to the finest and shortest at the top.
- Informal upright (模様木, moyogi) is a style of trees incorporating visible curves in trunk and branches, but the apex of the informal upright is located directly above the trunk's entry into the soil line.
- Slant (斜幹, shakan) is a style of bonsai possessing straight trunks like those of bonsai grown in the formal upright style. However, the slant style trunk emerges from the soil at an angle, and the apex of the bonsai will be located to the left or right of the root base.
- Cascade (懸崖, kengai) is a style of specimens modeled after trees that grow over water or down the sides of mountains. The apex (tip of the tree) in the semi-cascade (半懸崖, han-kengai) style bonsai extend just at or beneath the lip of the bonsai pot; the apex of a full cascade-style falls below the base of the pot.

A number of styles describe the trunk shape and bark finish. For example, the deadwood bonsai styles identify trees with prominent dead branches or trunk scarring.

- Shari (舎利幹, sharimiki) is a style involving the portrayal of a tree in its struggle to live while a significant part of its trunk is bare of bark.

Although most bonsai trees are planted directly into the soil, there are styles describing trees planted on rock.

- Root-over-rock (石上樹, sekijoju) is a style in which the roots of the tree are wrapped around a rock, entering the soil at the base of the rock.
- Growing-in-a-rock (石付 ishizuke or ishitsuki) is a style in which the roots of the tree are growing in soil contained within the cracks and holes of the rock.

While the majority of bonsai specimens feature a single tree, there are well-established style categories for specimens with multiple trunks.

- Forest or group (寄せ植え, yose ue) is a style comprising the planting of several or many trees of one species, typically an odd number, in a bonsai pot.
- Multi-trunk styles like sokan and sankan have all the trunks growing out of one spot with one root system, so the bonsai is actually a single tree.
- Raft (筏吹き, ikadabuki) is a style of bonsai that mimic a natural phenomenon that occurs when a tree topples onto its side from erosion or another natural force. Branches along the top side of the trunk continue to grow as a group of new trunks.

=== Other styles ===
A few styles do not fit into the preceding categories. These include:

- Broom (箒立ち, hokidachi) is a style employed for trees with fine branching, like elms. The trunk is straight and branches out in all directions about 1/3 of the way up the entire height of the tree. The branches and leaves form a ball-shaped crown.
- Windswept (吹き流し, fukinagashi) is a style describing a tree that appears to be affected by strong winds blowing continuously from one direction, as might shape a tree atop a mountain ridge or on an exposed shoreline.

== Aesthetics ==
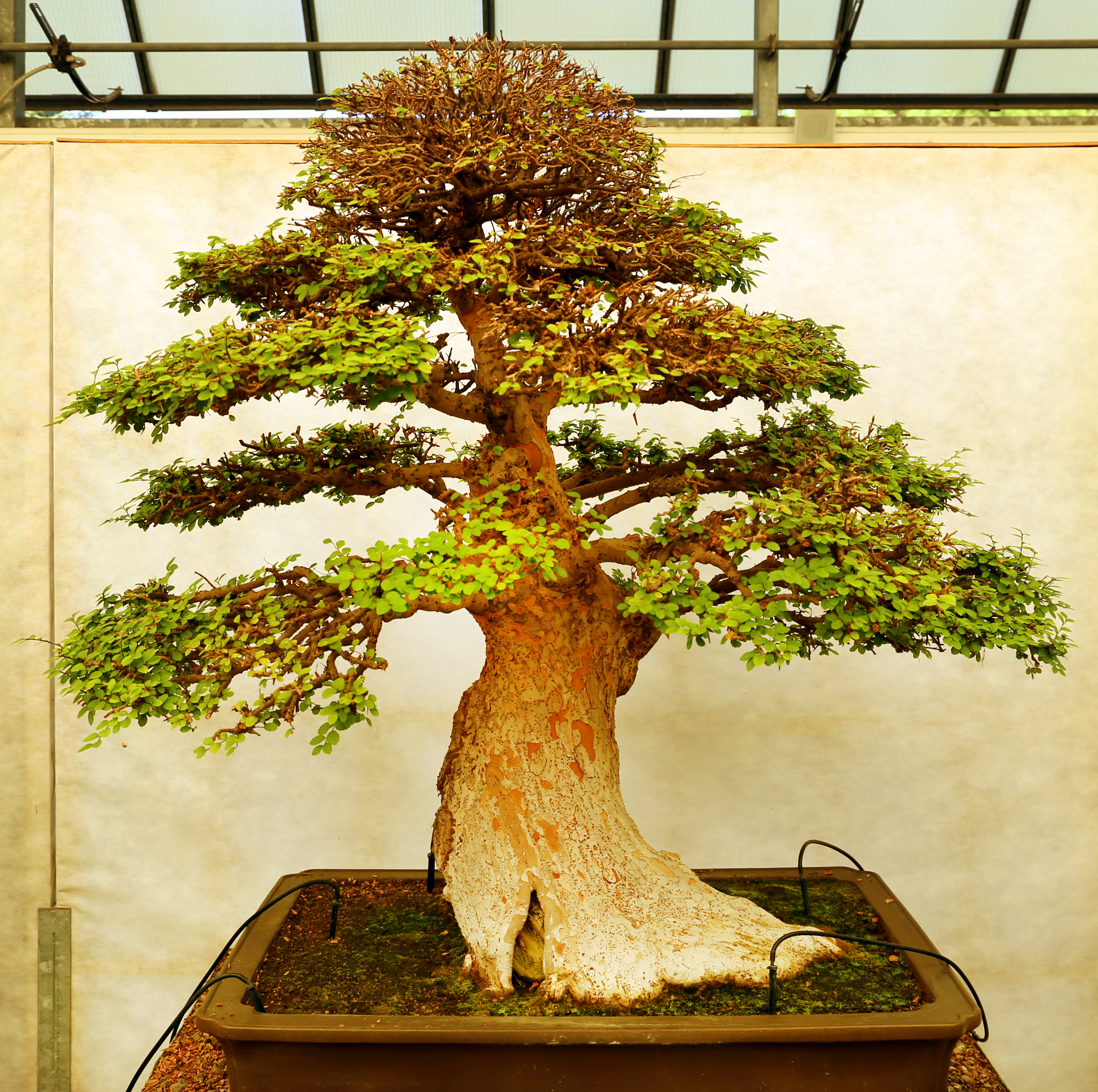
Ulmus parvifolia bonsai, informal upright style, about 120 years old

Bonsai aesthetics are the aesthetic goals characterizing the Japanese tradition of growing an artistically shaped miniature tree in a container. Many Japanese cultural characteristics, in particular the influence of Zen Buddhism and the expression of wabi-sabi, inform the bonsai tradition in Japan. Established art forms that share some aesthetic principles with bonsai include penjing and saikei. A number of other cultures around the globe have adopted the Japanese aesthetic approach to bonsai, and, while some variations have begun to appear, most hew closely to the rules and design philosophies of the Japanese tradition.

Over centuries of practice, the Japanese bonsai aesthetic has encoded some important techniques and design guidelines. Like the aesthetic rules that govern, for example, Western common practice period music, bonsai's guidelines help practitioners work within an established tradition with some assurance of success. Simply following the guidelines alone will not guarantee a successful result. Nevertheless, these design rules can rarely be broken without reducing the impact of the bonsai specimen. Some key principles in bonsai aesthetics include:

- Miniaturization: By definition, a bonsai is a tree kept small enough to be container-grown while otherwise fostered to have a mature appearance.
- Proportion among elements: The most prized proportions mimic those of a full-grown tree as closely as possible. Small trees with large leaves or needles are out of proportion and are avoided, as is a thin trunk with thick branches.
- Asymmetry: Bonsai aesthetics discourage strict radial or bilateral symmetry in branch and root placement.
- No trace of the artist: The designer's touch must not be apparent to the viewer. If a branch is removed in shaping the tree, the scar will be concealed. Likewise, wiring should be removed or at least concealed when the bonsai is shown, and must leave no permanent marks on the branch or bark.
- Poignancy: Many of the formal rules of bonsai help the grower create a tree that expresses Wabi-sabi, or portrays an aspect of mono no aware.

== Display ==
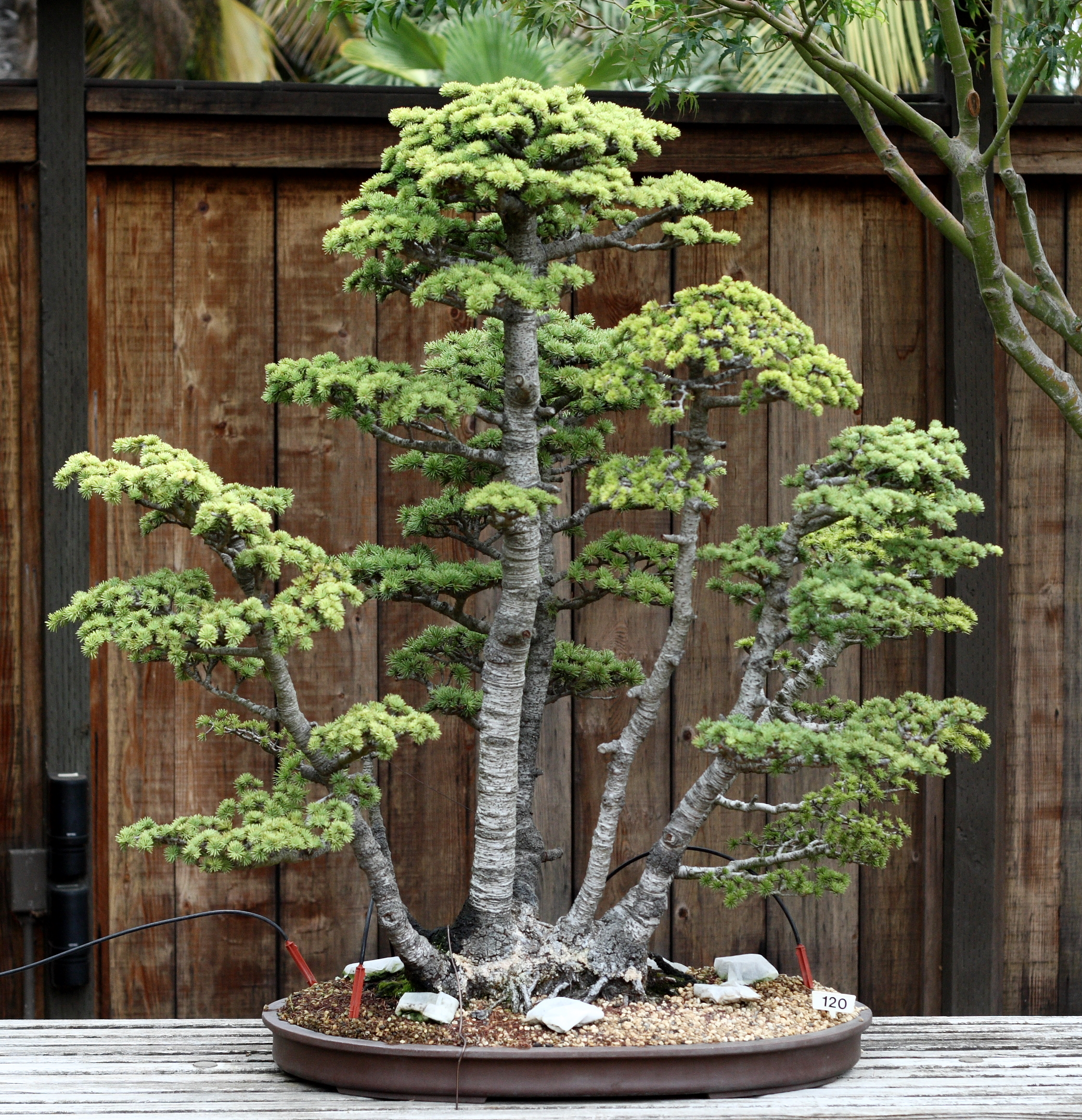
Bonsai displayed on an outdoor bench. Note the automated watering apparatus.

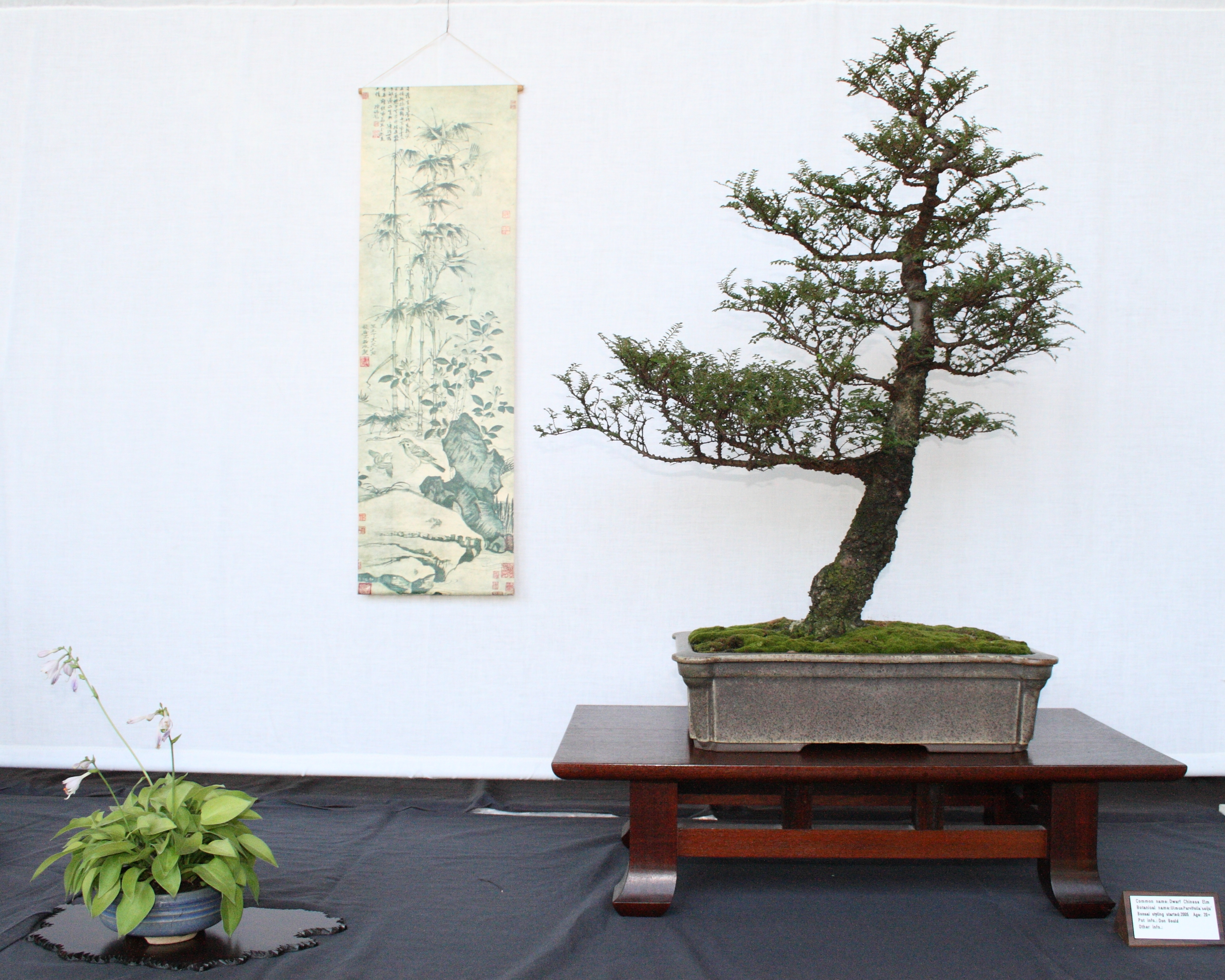
A Seiju elm bonsai on display with a shitakusa of miniature hosta and a hanging scroll

A bonsai display presents one or more bonsai specimens in a way that allows a viewer to see all the important features of the bonsai from the most advantageous position. That position emphasizes the bonsai's defined "front", which is designed into all bonsai. It places the bonsai at a height that allows the viewer to imagine the bonsai as a full-size tree seen from a distance, siting the bonsai neither so low that the viewer appears to be hovering in the sky above it nor so high that the viewer appears to be looking up at the tree from beneath the ground. Noted bonsai writer Peter Adams recommends that bonsai be shown as if "in an art gallery: at the right height; in isolation; against a plain background, devoid of all redundancies such as labels and vulgar little accessories."

For outdoor displays, there are few aesthetic rules. Many outdoor displays are semi-permanent, with the bonsai trees in place for weeks or months at a time. To avoid damaging the trees, therefore, an outdoor display must not impede the amount of sunlight needed for the trees on display, must support watering, and may also have to block excessive wind or precipitation. As a result of these practical constraints, outdoor displays are often rustic in style, with simple wood or stone components. A common design is the bench, sometimes with sections at different heights to suit different sizes of bonsai, along which bonsai are placed in a line. Where space allows, outdoor bonsai specimens are spaced far enough apart that the viewer can concentrate on one at a time. When the trees are too close to each other, aesthetic discord between adjacent trees of different sizes or styles can confuse the viewer, a problem addressed by exhibition displays.

Exhibition displays allow many bonsai to be displayed in a temporary exhibition format, typically indoors, as would be seen in a bonsai design competition. To allow many trees to be located close together, exhibition displays often use a sequence of small alcoves, each containing a single bonsai. The walls or dividers between the alcoves make it easier to view only one bonsai at a time. The back of the alcove is a neutral color and pattern to avoid distracting the viewer's eye. The bonsai pot is almost always placed on a formal stand, of a size and design selected to complement the bonsai and its pot.

Indoors, a formal bonsai display is arranged to represent a landscape, and traditionally consists of the featured bonsai tree in an appropriate pot atop a wooden stand, along with a shitakusa (companion plant) representing the foreground, and a hanging scroll representing the background. These three elements are chosen to complement each other and evoke a particular season, and are composed asymmetrically to mimic nature. When displayed inside a traditional Japanese home, a formal bonsai display will often be placed within the home's tokonoma or formal display alcove. An indoor display is usually very temporary, lasting a day or two, as most bonsai are intolerant of indoor conditions and lose vigor rapidly within the house.

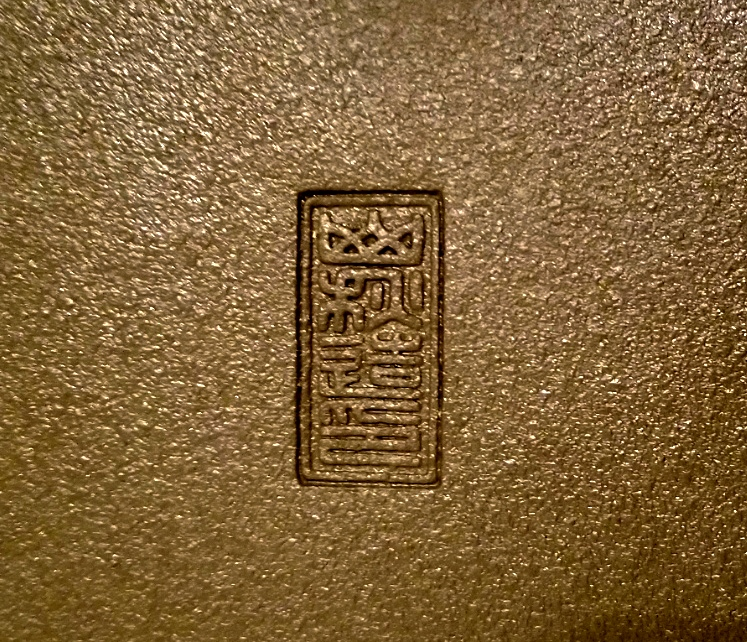
Seal of the Yamaaki kiln stamped on the underside of a bonsai pot. Yamaaki was a bonsai pot manufacturer founded in the 1920s in Tokoname, Japan.

=== Containers ===
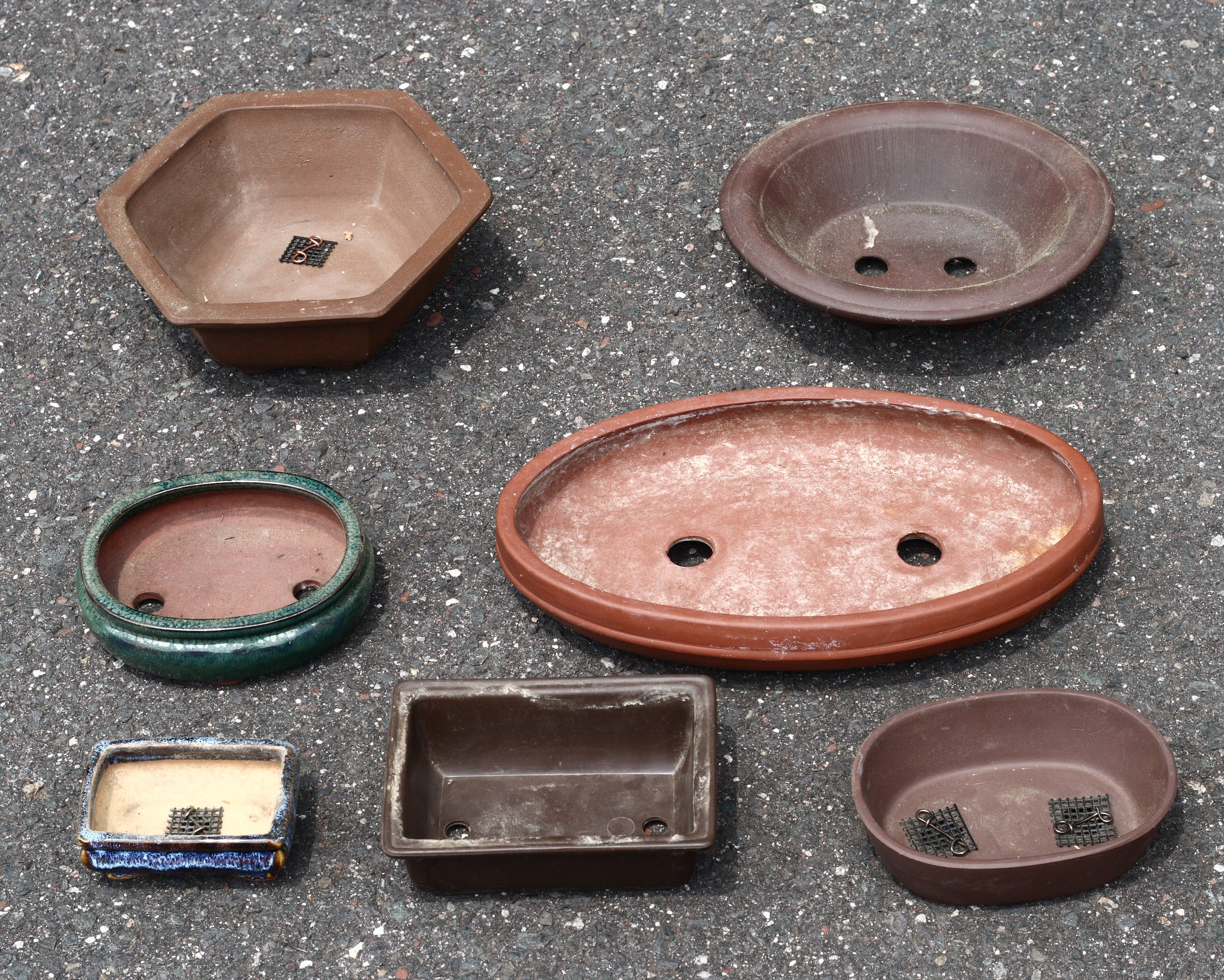
Assorted bonsai pots

A variety of informal containers may house the bonsai during its development, and even trees that have been formally planted in a bonsai pot may be returned to growing boxes from time to time. A large growing box can house several bonsai and provide a great volume of soil per tree to encourage root growth. A training box will have a single specimen, and a smaller volume of soil that helps condition the bonsai to the eventual size and shape of the formal bonsai container. There are no aesthetic guidelines for these development containers, and they may be of any material, size, and shape that suit the grower.

Completed trees are grown in formal bonsai containers. These containers are usually ceramic pots, which come in a variety of shapes and colors and may be glazed or unglazed. Unlike many common plant containers, bonsai pots have drainage holes at the bottom surface to complement fast-draining bonsai soil, allowing excess water to escape the pot. Growers cover the holes with a screening to prevent soil from falling out and to hinder pests from entering the pots from below. Pots usually have vertical sides, so that the tree's root mass can easily be removed for inspection, pruning, and replanting, although this is a practical consideration and other container shapes are acceptable.

There are alternatives to the conventional ceramic pot. Multi-tree bonsai may be created atop a fairly flat slab of rock, with the soil mounded above the rock surface and the trees planted within the raised soil. In recent times, bonsai creators have also begun to fabricate rock-like slabs from raw materials including concrete and glass-reinforced plastic. Such constructed surfaces can be made much lighter than solid rock, can include depressions or pockets for additional soil, and can be designed for drainage of water, all characteristics difficult to achieve with solid rock slabs. Other unconventional containers can also be used, but in formal bonsai display and competitions in Japan, the ceramic bonsai pot is the most common container.

For bonsai being shown formally in their completed state, pot shape, color, and size are chosen to complement the tree as a picture frame is chosen to complement a painting. In general, containers with straight sides and sharp corners are used for formally-shaped plants, while oval or round containers are used for plants with informal designs. Many aesthetic guidelines affect the selection of pot finish and color. For example, evergreen bonsai are often placed in unglazed pots, while deciduous trees usually appear in glazed pots. Pots are also distinguished by their size. The overall design of the bonsai tree, the thickness of its trunk, and its height are considered when determining the size of a suitable pot.

Some pots are highly collectible, like ancient Chinese or Japanese pots made in regions with experienced pot makers such as Tokoname, Japan, or Yixing, China. Today, many potters worldwide produce pots for bonsai.

== Bonsai artists ==
Below is a list of some notable bonsai artists.

Name	Year of birth	Year of death	Nationality
Bjorn Bjorholm	1986		American
Marco Invernizzi	1975		Italian
Masahiko Kimura	1940		Japanese
Kunio Kobayashi	1948		Japanese
John Naka	1914	2004	American
Frank Okamura	1911	2006	Japanese-American
Walter Pall	1944		Austrian-German
Sinji Suzuki	1954		Japanese
William N. Valavanis	1951		Greek-American
Yuji Yoshimura	1921	1997	Japanese

== Bonsai exhibitions ==
There are exhibitions, shows, and competitions dedicated to bonsai all around the world. However, there is a consensus that the best specimens are in Japan. Japan has several private and public museums dedicated to bonsai, such as the Shunka-en Bonsai Garden in Tokyo and the Omiya Bonsai Museum in Saitama.

In the United States, there are two museums dedicated to bonsai, the National Bonsai & Penjing Museum at the National Arboretum in Washington DC, and the Pacific Bonsai Museum close to Tacoma, WA.

Japan also hosts several annual bonsai competitions where trees compete for awards in different categories. The most prestigious bonsai competition for amateur-owned trees, although most trees are prepared for display by professionals, is the Kokufu-ten, held every year in the month of February in the Tokyo Metropolitan Art Museum. The Kokufu-ten is the oldest competition in Japan, celebrating in 2023 its 97th edition. Awards are presented in different categories.

For bonsai professionals, the top competition in Japan is the Nippon Bonsai Sakufu-ten organized by the Japan Bonsai Cooperative Association. The competition is held in December of each year and the top prize is the Prime Minister Award, which went to Hiroaki Suzuki in 2022 for a Shimpaku Juniper tree.

== Size classifications ==
Japanese bonsai exhibitions and catalogs frequently refer to the size of individual bonsai specimens by assigning them to size classes (see table below). Not all sources agree on the exact sizes or names for these size ranges, but the concept of the ranges is well-established and useful to both the cultivation and the aesthetic understanding of the trees. A photograph of a bonsai may not give the viewer an accurate impression of the tree's real size, so printed documents may complement a photograph by naming the bonsai's size class. The size class implies the height and weight of the tree in its container.

In the very largest size ranges, a recognized Japanese practice is to name the trees "two-handed", "four-handed", and so on, based on the number of men required to move the tree and pot. These trees will have dozens of branches and can closely simulate a full-size tree. The very largest size, called "imperial", is named after the enormous potted trees of Japan's Imperial Palace.

At the other end of the size spectrum, there are a number of specific techniques and styles associated solely with the smallest common sizes, mame and shito. These techniques take advantage of the bonsai's minute dimensions and compensate for the limited number of branches and leaves that can appear on a tree this small.

Common names for bonsai size classes
Large bonsai
Common name	Size class	Tree Height
Imperial bonsai	Eight-handed	152–203 cm (60–80 in)
Hachi-uye	Six-handed	102–152 cm (40–60 in)
Dai	Four-handed	76–122 cm (30–48 in)
Omono	Four-handed	76–122 cm (30–48 in)
Medium-size bonsai
Common name	Size class	Tree Height
Chiu	Two-handed	41–91 cm (16–36 in)
Chumono	Two-handed	41–91 cm (16–36 in)
Katade-mochi	One-handed	25–46 cm (10–18 in)
Miniature bonsai
Common name	Size class	Tree Height
Komono	One-handed	15–25 cm (6–10 in)
Shohin	One-handed	13–20 cm (5–8 in)
Mame	Palm size	5–15 cm (2–6 in)
Shito	Fingertip size	5–10 cm (2–4 in)
Keshitsubo	Poppy-seed size	3–8 cm (1–3 in)

== Indoor bonsai ==
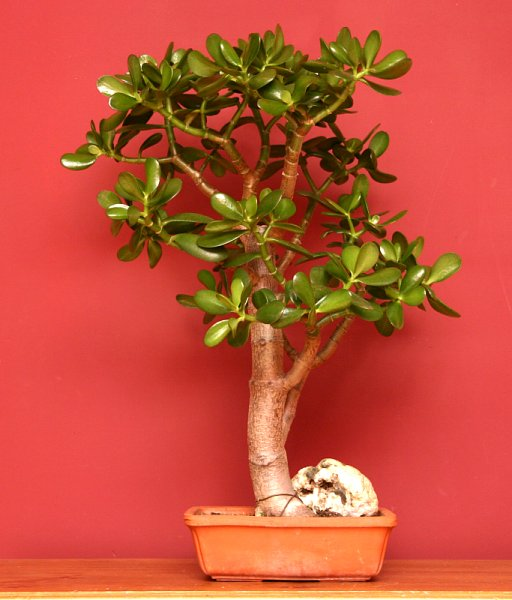
Jade plant grown as an indoor bonsai

The Japanese tradition of bonsai does not include indoor bonsai, and bonsai appearing at Japanese exhibitions or in catalogs have been grown outdoors for their entire lives. In less-traditional settings, including climates more severe than Japan's, indoor bonsai may appear in the form of potted trees cultivated for the indoor environment.

Traditionally, bonsai are temperate climate trees grown outdoors in containers. Kept in the artificial environment of a home, these trees weaken and die. However, a number of tropical and sub-tropical tree species will survive and grow indoors, such as the jade plant and members of the genus Ficus.

== See also ==
- Bonsai aesthetics
- Bonsai cultivation and care
- Bonsai Kitten
- Bonsai styles
- Chrysanthemum bonsai
- List of species used in bonsai
- Tree shaping
- Dwarf forest
- Kokedama
- Kusamono
