= Bjorn Bjorholm =

American bonsai artist

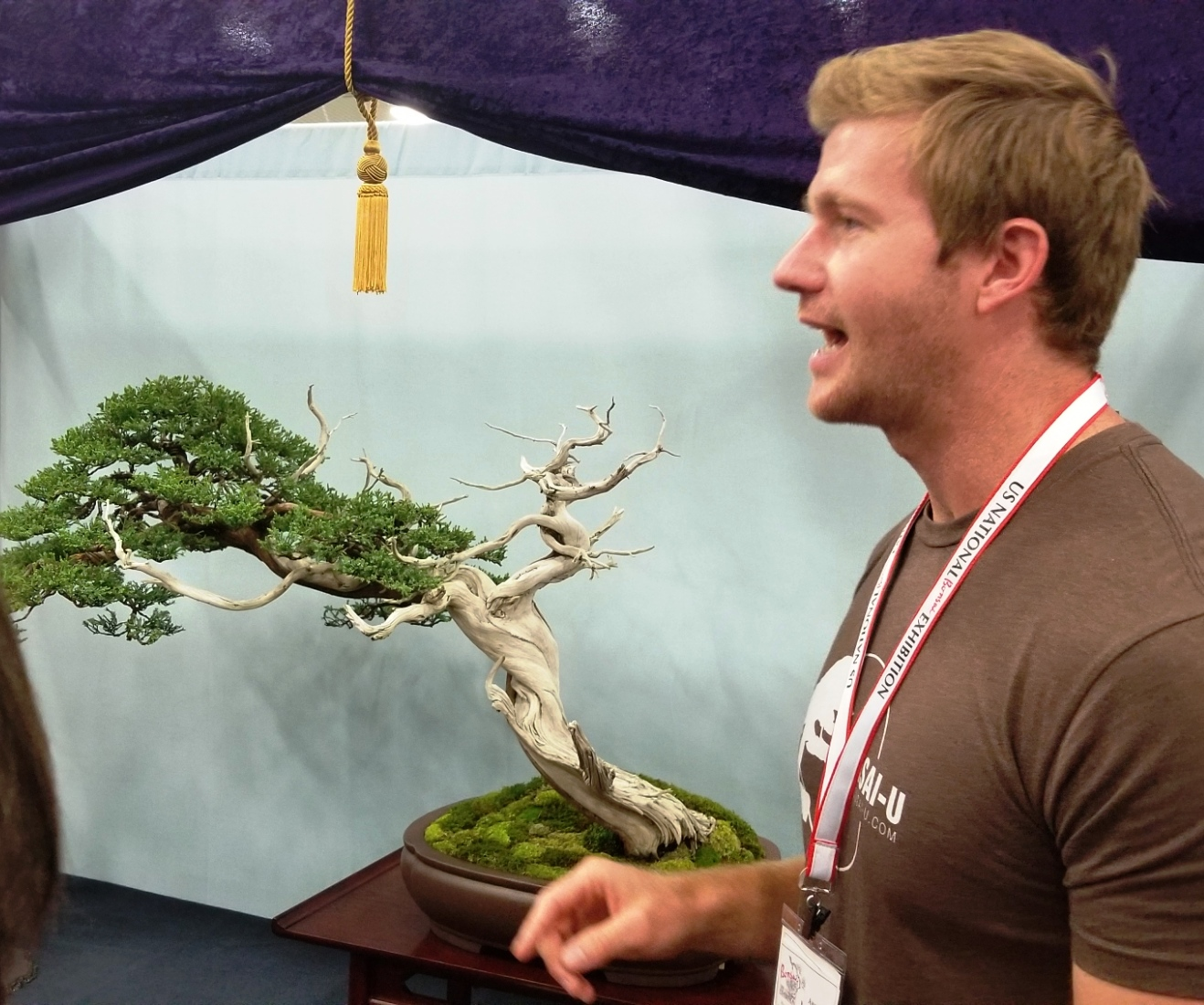
- Bjorholm delivering a critique at the 7th U.S. National Bonsai Exhibition in September 2021 in Rochester, NY.
- Born: 1986 (age 39–40)
- Known for: Bonsai
- Spouse: Nanxi Chen
- Website: http://bjornbjorholm.com/

Bjorn Bjorholm (/ˈbjɔːrn ˈbjɔːrhoʊm/; born 1986) is an American professional bonsai artist and educator. He is the founder and owner of Eisei-en Bonsai Garden, which as of early 2024, is in the process of relocating from Mount Juliet, Tennessee, to Kyoto, Japan.

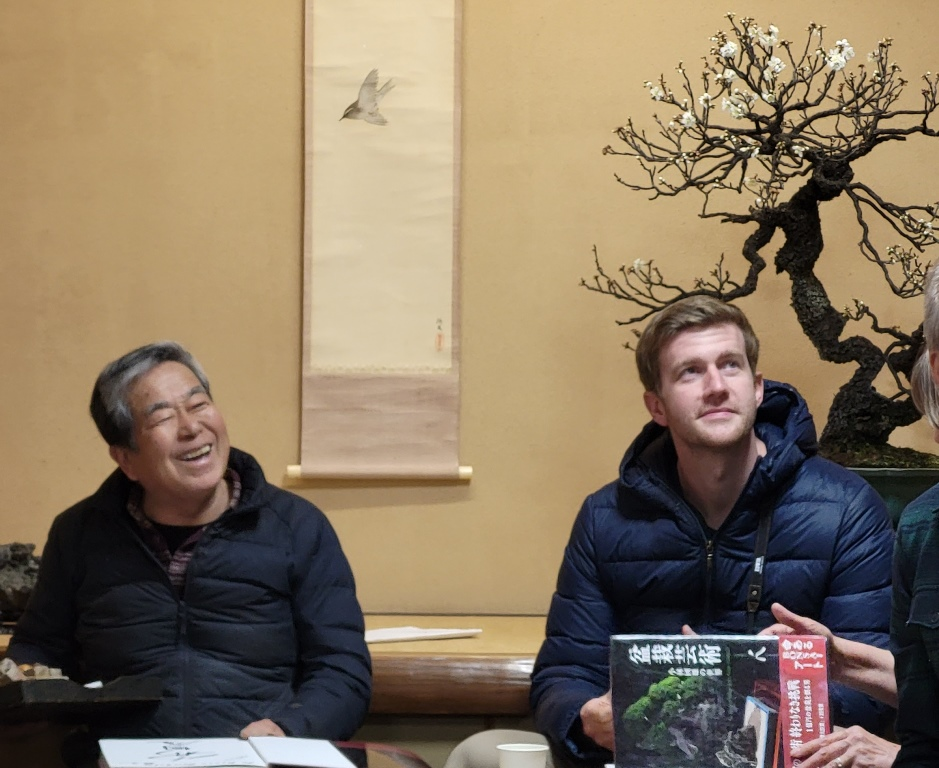
Bjorn Bjorholm with Japanese bonsai master Kunio Kobayashi during a visit to Kobayashi's Shunka-en Bonsai Museum near Tokyo, Japan in February 2023.

== Early life and education ==
Bjorholm was born in 1986 and grew up in Knoxville, Tennessee. At the early age of 13, he received his first bonsai tree inspired by the movie "The Karate Kid." Although the tree was dead within a few months, Bjorholm was hooked on the Japanese artform, which would prove to be his life's calling. In 2001, he and his father, Tom Bjorholm, founded the Knoxville Bonsai Society.

At age 16, Bjorholm visited Japan as part of a student group. There, he met bonsai master Keiichi Fujikawa who will later become his teacher and mentor. Before beginning a formal apprenticeship, Bjorholm studied the artform with several bonsai professionals in the United States.

== Career ==
After graduating from college in 2008 at age 22, Bjorholm applied and became an apprentice under Keiichi Fujikawa at Kouka-en Bonsai Nursery in Osaka, Japan. He apprenticed for six years before becoming certified as a bonsai professional by the Nippon Bonsai Association. Thereafter, he worked as an artist-in-residence at Kouka-en, making him Japan's first foreign-born working bonsai artist. As part of his job at Kouka-en, Bjorholm styled and maintained many trees registered as "masterpiece" by Japan's Nippon Bonsai Association, and other important trees that would subsequently enter the prestigious Kokufu-ten bonsai exhibition, Japan's premier showcase of the artform.

Upon his return to the United States, in 2018, Bjorholm established Eisei-en (Japanese: 永青園) Bonsai Garden in Mount Juliet, Tennessee, where he teaches bonsai, styles and cares for privately owned trees and for his own collection, and sells and brokers bonsai for a discerning clientele.

As part of his work spreading bonsai art, Bjorholm has an active YouTube channel with a base of over 200,000 subscribers around the world, as well as a subscription-based online learning platform, Bonsai-U.

In 2019, Bjorholm dealt several bonsai trees for the Government of the United Arab Emirates, which the nation gave as gifts to various recipients, including the Central Intelligence Agency.

In early September 2023, Bjorholm announced that he will be permanently relocating with his family to Kyoto, Japan, in mid-2024. As a result, his Tennessee-based bonsai garden, Eisei-en, will close and he will establish Eisei-en Kyoto, his new bonsai garden. Bjorholm will continue to operate his online learning platform, Bonsai-U.

== See also ==
- Bonsai
- Bonsai cultivation and care
