= Akadama =

Mineral used in gardening

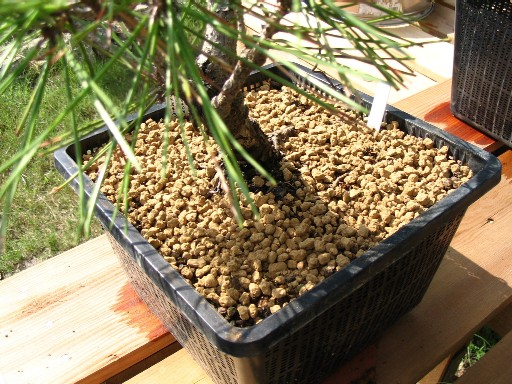
Dry akadama

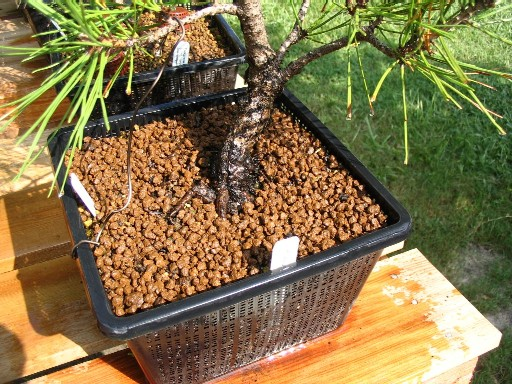
Wet akadama

Akadama (赤玉土, akadamatsuchi; red ball earth) is a naturally occurring, granular clay-like mineral used as soil for bonsai trees and other container-grown plants. It is surface-mined, immediately sifted and bagged, and supplied in various grades; the deeper-mined grade are somewhat harder and more useful in horticulture than the softer, shallow-mined grades. Akadama may also act as one component of a growing medium when combined with other elements such as sand, composted bark, peat, or crushed lava rock. The color darkens when moist which can help the grower determine when to water a tree.

While akadama is more costly than alternative soil components, it is prized by many growers for its ability to retain water and nutrients while still providing porosity and free drainage. For all of its qualities, many bonsai growers consider the cost of akadama prohibitive or unnecessary. Still other growers claim that when subjected to cold and wet climates, the granules progressively break down into smaller particles that inhibit drainage, an unwanted characteristic of bonsai soil. This problem can be avoided either by incorporating sand or grit in the soil mix, or by using the deeper-mined, harder grades.

== Origin ==
Due to volcanic activity, Japan enjoys rich volcanic resources. After volcanic eruptions, volcanic rocks and pumice accumulate near the volcano. Several horticultural products based on these materials have been developed in Japan, two of which are the Akadama and kanuma soils.

== Size and components ==
Components include silicon dioxide SiO_{2} 42.7%, calcium oxide CaO 0.98%, magnesium oxide MgO 2.5%, manganese oxide MnO 0.15%, iron oxide Fe_{2}O_{3} 8.4%, and aluminium oxide Al_{2}O_{3} 25.1%.

Akadama has a pH of 6.9 and conductivity of 0.052 ms/cm.

== Uses ==
Akadama is used in the cultivation of plants. It can be used alone or mixed in as an amendment to other soil substrates such as lava rock, pumice, stone, peat moss, bark, etc. It is supplied in various sizes including "Shohin" (less than 1/16 inch), "Small" (1/16 inch to 1/4 inch), and "Medium" (1/4 inch to 1/2 inch). All sizes are suitable for many sorts of potted plants, but in particular, shohin or small is the preferred choice for cactus and succulent plants.

== Regional variation and quality differences ==
Many premium akadama soils are mined from Japan’s Kanto region, particularly Ibaraki Prefecture. The volcanic subsoils there contain allophane- and imogolite-type clay minerals that produce hard, porous granules with stable structure under repeated watering. Akadama from other regions may contain more volcanic ash or loosely consolidated material, making it softer and more prone to disintegration. For this reason, “hard quality” (硬質 kōshitsu) akadama from Ibaraki is often preferred by bonsai growers for its durability and long-term stability.
