= Kusamono and shitakusa =

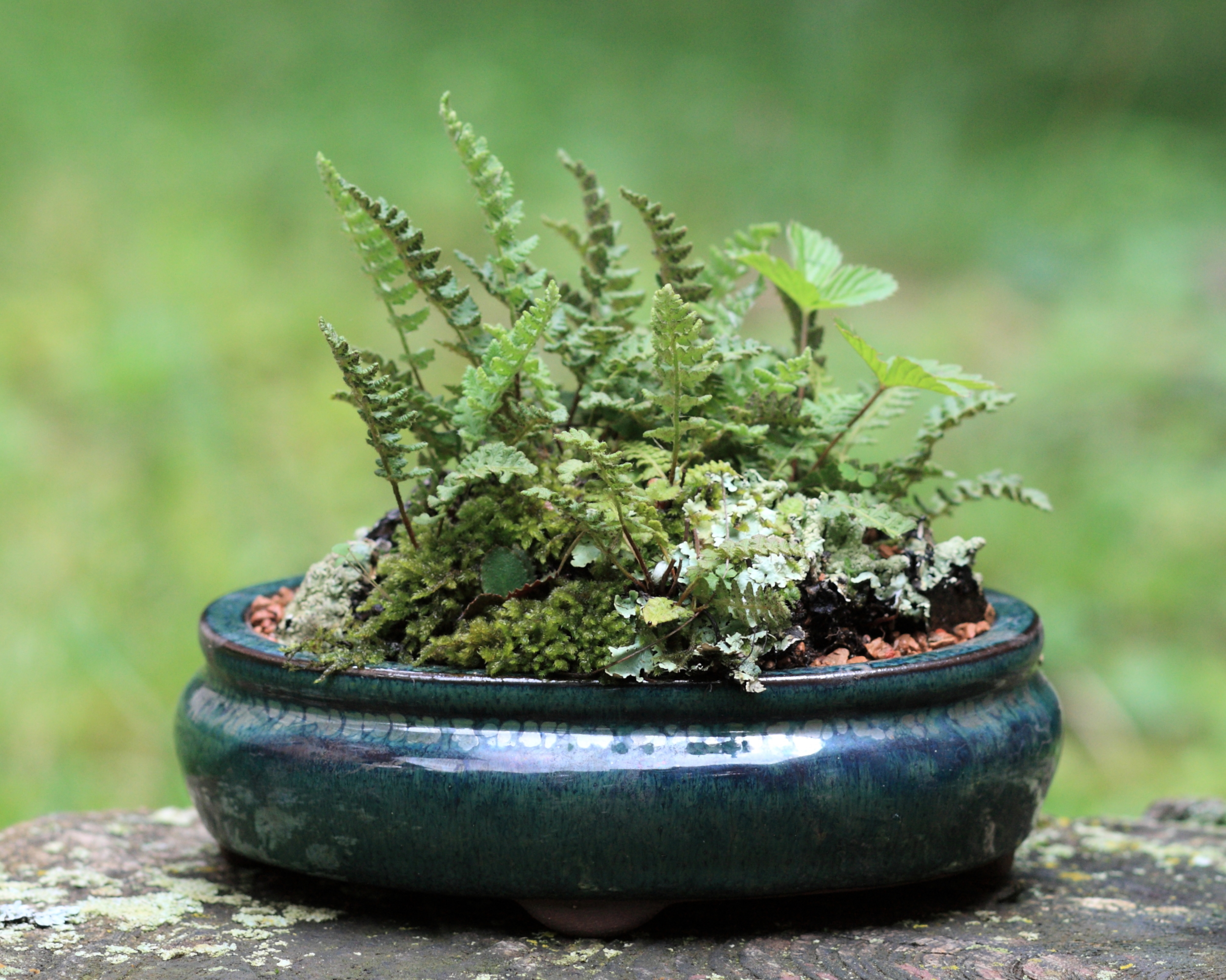
A kusamono made of plants from Connecticut, during the summer

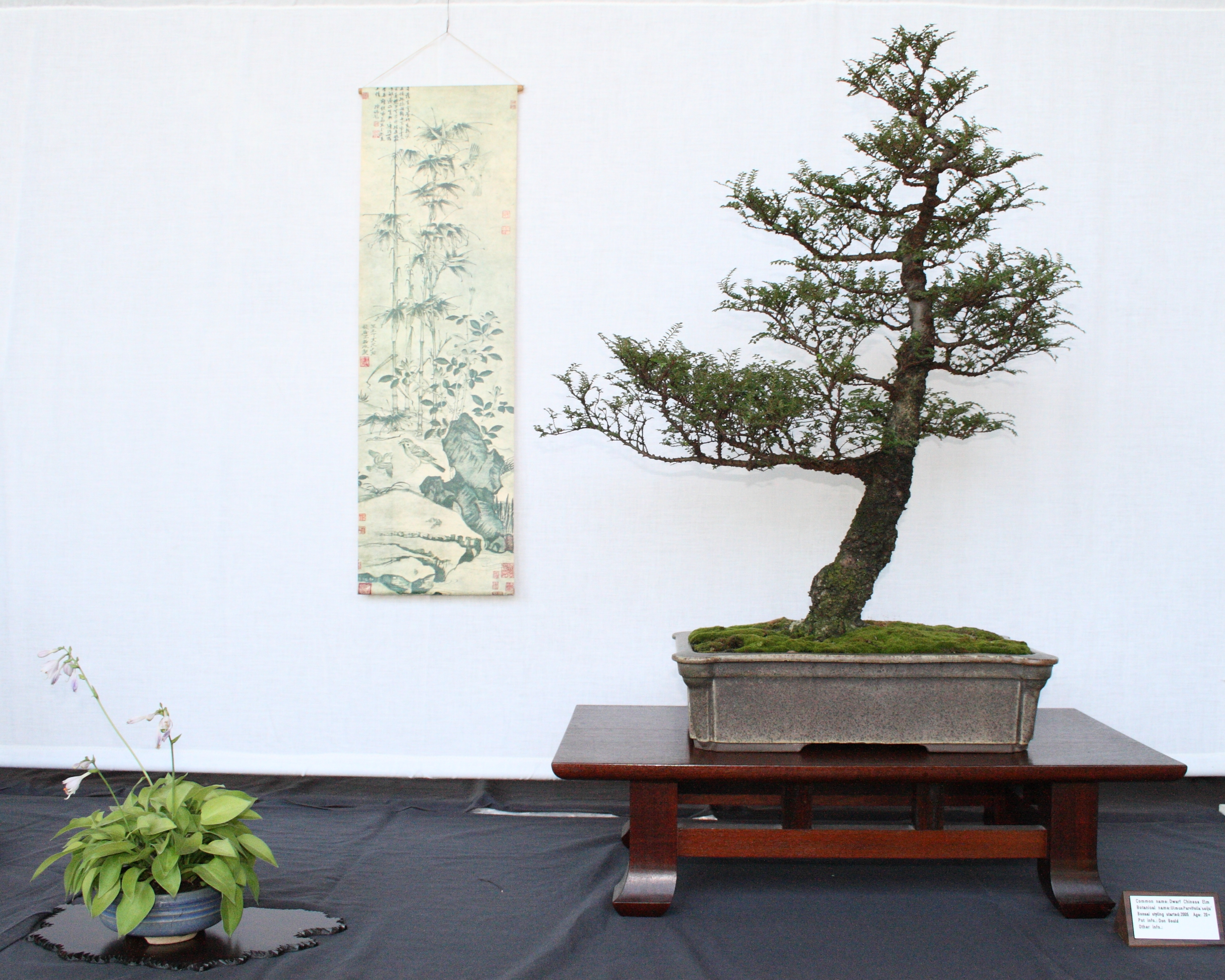
A shitakusa of miniature hosta (front left) as part of a formal bonsai display

Kusamono (草物; lit. 'grass thing') and shitakusa (下草; lit. 'undergrass') are a potted collection of plants designed to be viewed either in accompaniment with bonsai or alone.

== Overview ==
Normally, the term kusamono is used when the planting is displayed as the center of attention, while the term shitakusa is used for plantings that accompany bonsai displays. In contrast to underplantings (which are potted in with the bonsai), kusamono and shitakusa are displayed separately in special pots, driftwood, or even stones.

== Plants used ==
Plants used are typically moss, grass, lichen, small flowers, bamboo, or bulbs, that may heighten the beauty or reflect a certain season. While traditionally in Japan, plants gathered from mountains contributed to the bulk of companion plantings, modern use has extended to more creative and artistic design.

== See also ==
- Chrysanthemum bonsai
- Ōmiya Bonsai Village
