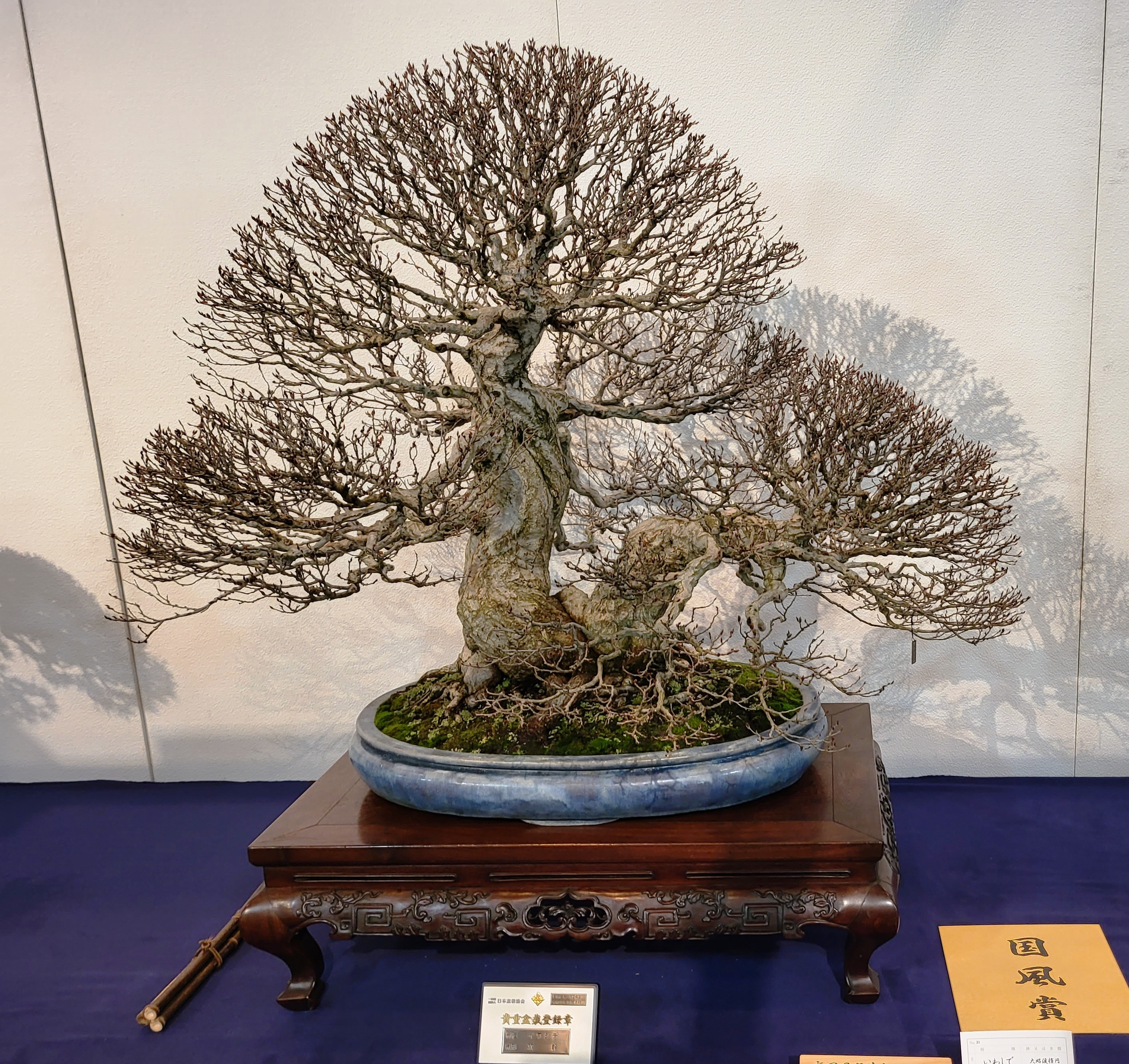
- Korean Hornbeam (Carpinus turczaninovii) as bonsai in winter. This tree received an award at the 97th Kokufu-ten bonsai exhibition in Tokyo in February 2023. It is also registered as a valuable bonsai specimen.
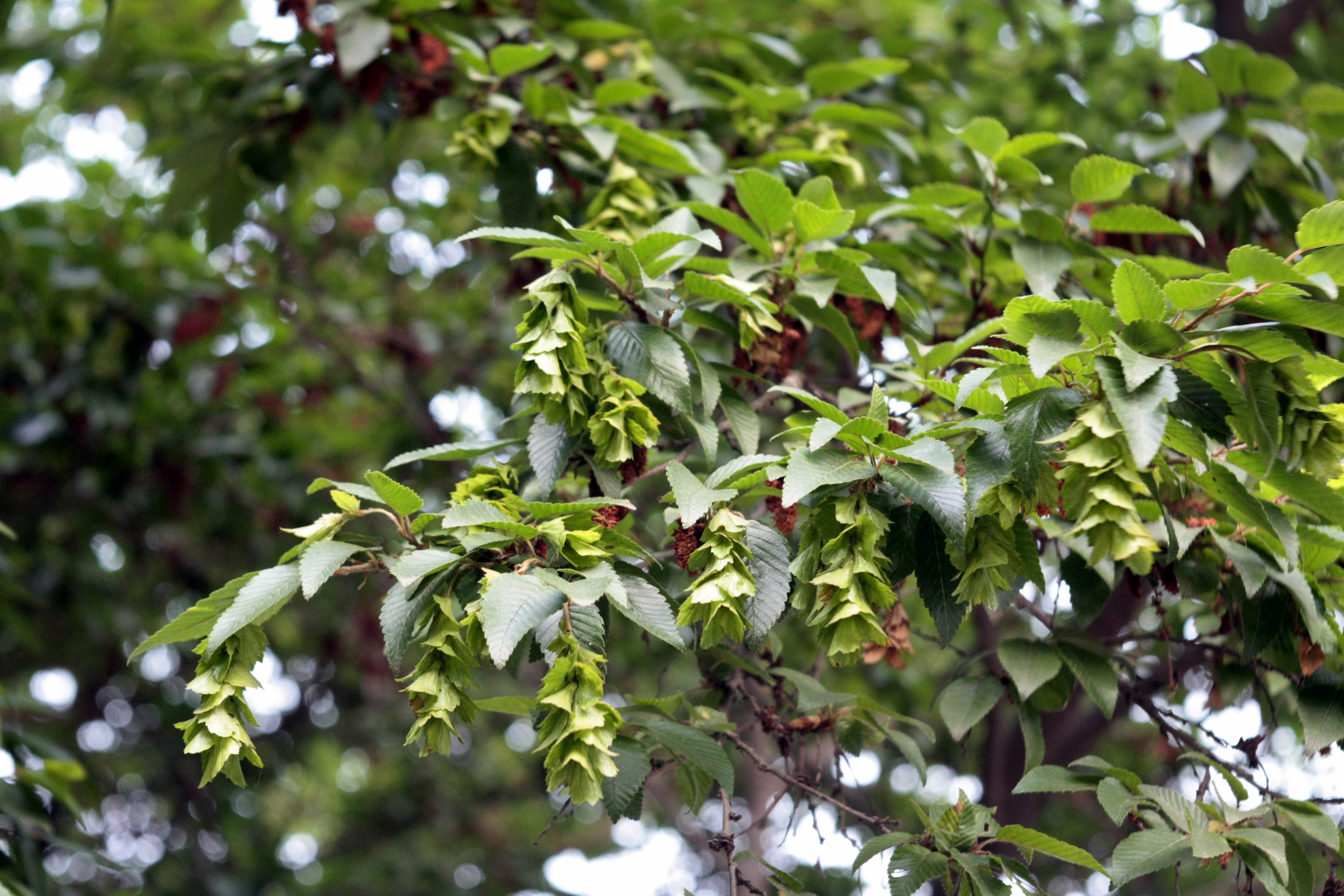
- Flowers are hop-like.

Conservation status
- Least Concern (IUCN 3.1)

Scientific classification
- Kingdom: Plantae
- Clade: Embryophytes
- Clade: Tracheophytes
- Clade: Angiosperms
- Clade: Eudicots
- Clade: Rosids
- Order: Fagales
- Family: Betulaceae
- Genus: Carpinus
- Species: C. turczaninovii

Binomial name
- Carpinus turczaninovii Hance

Synonyms
- List: Carpinus chowii Hu; Carpinus coreana Nakai; Carpinus coreana var. major Nakai; Carpinus paxii H.J.P.Winkl.; Carpinus stipulata H.J.P.Winkl.; Carpinus tanakaeana Makino; Carpinus turczaninovii var. chungnanensis P.C.Kuo; Carpinus turczaninovii var. coreana (Nakai) W.Lee; Carpinus turczaninovii f. coreana (Nakai) M.Kim; Carpinus turczaninovii var. stipulata (H.J.P.Winkl.) H.J.P.Winkl.

= Carpinus turczaninovii =

Species of flowering plant

Carpinus turczaninovii, the Turczaninow hornbeam or Korean hornbeam, is a species of flowering plant in the family Betulaceae, native to central China, the Korean Peninsula, and central and southern Japan. It is a large shrub or small tree typically 15 to 20 ft (5 to 6 m) tall and about 75% as wide, and is hardy to USDA zone 5b. It is available from commercial suppliers, and can handle very hard pruning.
