= List of species used in bonsai =

List of species commonly used in bonsai.

== A-D ==
Botanical name	Common name	Example	References
Abies	Fir		
Acer buergerianum	Trident maple		
Acer campestre	Field maple; Hedge maple		
Acer circinatum	Vine maple		
Acer ginnala	Amur maple		
Acer monspessulanum	Montpelier maple		
Acer palmatum	Japanese maple		
Acer pseudoplatanus	Sycamore maple		
Acer rubrum	Red maple		
Adenium, especially Adenium obesum	Desert rose		
Alnus	Alder		
Amelanchier canadensis	Amelanchier		
Ampelopsis, including Ampelopsis glandulosa	Ampelopsis		
Aralia (see also the following, all previously classified as Aralia: Dizygotheca castor; Polyscias fruticosa; Schefflera elegantissima	Aralia		
Arbutus	Strawberry tree		
Asteraceae	Chrysanthemum		
Berberis	Barberry		
Betula	Birch		
Betula nigra	River Birch		
Bougainvillea	Bougainvillea		
Brya ebenus	Jamaican rain tree		
Buxus, including: Buxus microphylla; Buxus harlandii	Box, Boxwood		
Camellia, especially Camellia japonica	Camellia		
Carmona microphylla	Fukien tea tree, Ehretia microphylla		
Carpinus	Hornbeam		
Cedrus	Cedar		
Cedrus libani	Lebanon cedar; Blue Atlas cedar		
Celtis sinensis	Chinese Hackberry		
Chaenomeles	Flowering Quince		
Chamaecyparis	Cypress		
Chamaecyparis obtusa	Hinoki Cypress		
Chamaecyparis pisifera	Sawara Cypress		
Cissus antarctica	Australian grape vine; Wild Grape; Kangaroo Vine		
Citrus aurantifolia	Key lime		
Cornus	Dogwood		
Cotinus coggygria	Smoke Tree		
Cotoneaster	Cotoneaster		
Crassula, especially Crassula ovata	Jades		
Crataegus	Hawthorn		
Cryptomeria	Sugi		
Cupressus, especially Cupressus macrocarpa	Cupressus		
Cydonia oblonga	Common Quince		
Dasiphora fruticosa	Shrubby Cinquefoil		
Diospyros virginiana	Common Persimmon		

== E to G ==
Botanical name	Common name	Example	References
Elaeagnus	Elaeagnus		
Enkianthus	Enkianthus		
Eugenia	Brush cherries		
Euphorbia balsamifera	Wolfsmilk		
Euonymus	Spindle		
Fagus	Beech		
Ficus benghalensis	Banyan		
Ficus benjamina	Weeping fig		
Ficus carica	Fig tree, common fig		
Ficus microcarpa	Chinese Banyan Fig		
Ficus neriifolia	Willow-leaved Fig		
Ficus rubiginosa	Port Jackson fig		
Fortunella hindsii	Dwarf orange		
Fraxinus	Ash		
Fuchsia, including Fuchsia fulgens hybrids	Fuchsia		
Gardenia, including Gardenia jasminoides	Gardenia		
Ginkgo biloba	Ginkgo		
Grevillea robusta	Australian Silver Oak		

== H to L ==
Botanical name	Common name	Example	References
Hedera helix	Ivy		
Gledista triacanthos	Honey Locust		
Hibiscus syriacus	Hibiscus		
Ilex	Holly		
Jacaranda mimosifolia	Blue jacaranda		
Jasminum nudiflorum	Winter Jasmine		
Juniperus procumbens	Dwarf Japanese Garden Juniper		
Juniperus californica	California Juniper	California-juniper-bonsai-collection	
Juniperus chinensis	Chinese Juniper; Shimpaku		
Juniperus squamata	Blue Juniper		
Juniperus virginiana	Eastern Juniper		
Lagerstroemia, including Lagerstroemia indica	Crape myrtle, Indian Lilac		
Lantana camara	Spanish Flag; West Indian Lantana; Jamaica Mountain Sage; Surinam Tea Plant		
Larix	Japanese Larch, American Larch, Tamarack		
Ligustrum	Privet		
Liquidambar	Sweetgum		
Lonicera	Shrubby Honeysuckles		

== M to P ==
Botanical name	Common name	Example	References
Maclura pomifera	Osage Orange		
Malpighia, including Malpighia coccigera	Barbados Cherry		
Magnolia stellata	Star Magnolia		
Malus	Apple/Crabapple		
Mangifera	Mango		
Metasequoia	Dawn Redwood		
Murraya paniculata	Orange Jasmine, Satinwood		
Myrciaria cauliflora	Jaboticaba		
Myrtus, including Myrtus communis	Myrtle		
Nandina domestica	Sacred or Heavenly Bamboo		
Nashia inaguensis	Bahama berry		
Neea buxifolia	Tropical boxwood		
Nothofagus	Southern beeches		
Olea europaea	Olive, European olive		
Parthenocissus	Creeper, Boston Ivy		
Phyllostachys	Bamboo		
Picea	Spruce		
Pieris	Andromeda		
Pinus clausa	Sand Pine		
Pinus mugo	Mugo Pine, Mountain Pine		
Pinus parviflora	Japanese White Pine		
Pinus thunbergii	Japanese Black Pine		
Pinus virginiana	Virginia Pine		
Pinus ponderosa	Western Yellow Pine		
Pistacia chinensis	Chinese pistache		
Pittosporum	Pittosporum		
Podocarpus, including Podocarpus macrophyllus	Podocarpus, Yew Podocarpus, Kusamaki		
Polyscias fruticosa	Ming Aralia		
Portulacaria afra	Dwarf jade, elephant food, elephant bush		
Prunus cerasifera	Flowering Plum		
Prunus serrulata	Japanese Flowering Cherry (櫻)		
Prunus mume	Flowering Apricot (梅)		
Pseudosasa	Bamboo		
Pseudotsuga menziesii	Douglas Fir		
Punica granatum, including Punica granatum 'Nana'	Pomegranate		
Pyracantha	Firethorn		

== Q to Z ==
Botanical name	Common name	Example	References
Quercus	Oak		
Rhaphiolepis indica	Indian Hawthorn		
Rhododendron, including: Rhododendron simsii; Rhododendron indicum; Rhododendron obtusum var. amoenum	Azalea; Satsuki azalea; Kurume azalea		
Robinia pseudoacacia	Black Locust		
Rosmarinus officinalis	Rosemary		
Sageretia, including Sageretia theezans	Chinese Sweet Plum, Pauper's Tea		
Sasa	Bamboo		
Schefflera actinophylla	Australian Umbrella Tree		
Serissa foetida	Snow Rose; Japanese Boxthorn; Tree of a Thousand Stars		
Sorbus	Rowan and Whitebeam		
Syzygium australe	Brush cherry, Woolgoolga		
Syzygium buxifolium	Boxleaf eugenia, fish-scale bush		
Syzygium smithii formerly Acmena smithii	Brush cherry		
Tamarix	Tamarisk		
Taxodium ascendens	Pond cypress		
Taxodium distichum	Bald cypress		
Taxodium mucronatum	Montezuma Cypress		
Taxus	Yew		
Thymus	Thyme		
Tsuga	Hemlock		
Ulmus alata	Winged Elm		
Ulmus crassifolia	Cedar Elm		
Ulmus minor	Field elm		
Ulmus parvifolia	Chinese Elm		
Ulmus pumila	Siberian Elm		
Wisteria floribunda	Japanese Wisteria		
Wisteria sinensis	Chinese Wisteria		
Zelkova serrata	Japanese Elm		
Zanthoxylum	Chinese Pepper		
