= Willow-leaved fig =

Willow-leaved fig may refer to:

- Ficus neriifolia, native to Asia
- Ficus salicifolia, native to Africa
