= Chrysanthemum bonsai =

Japanese art form

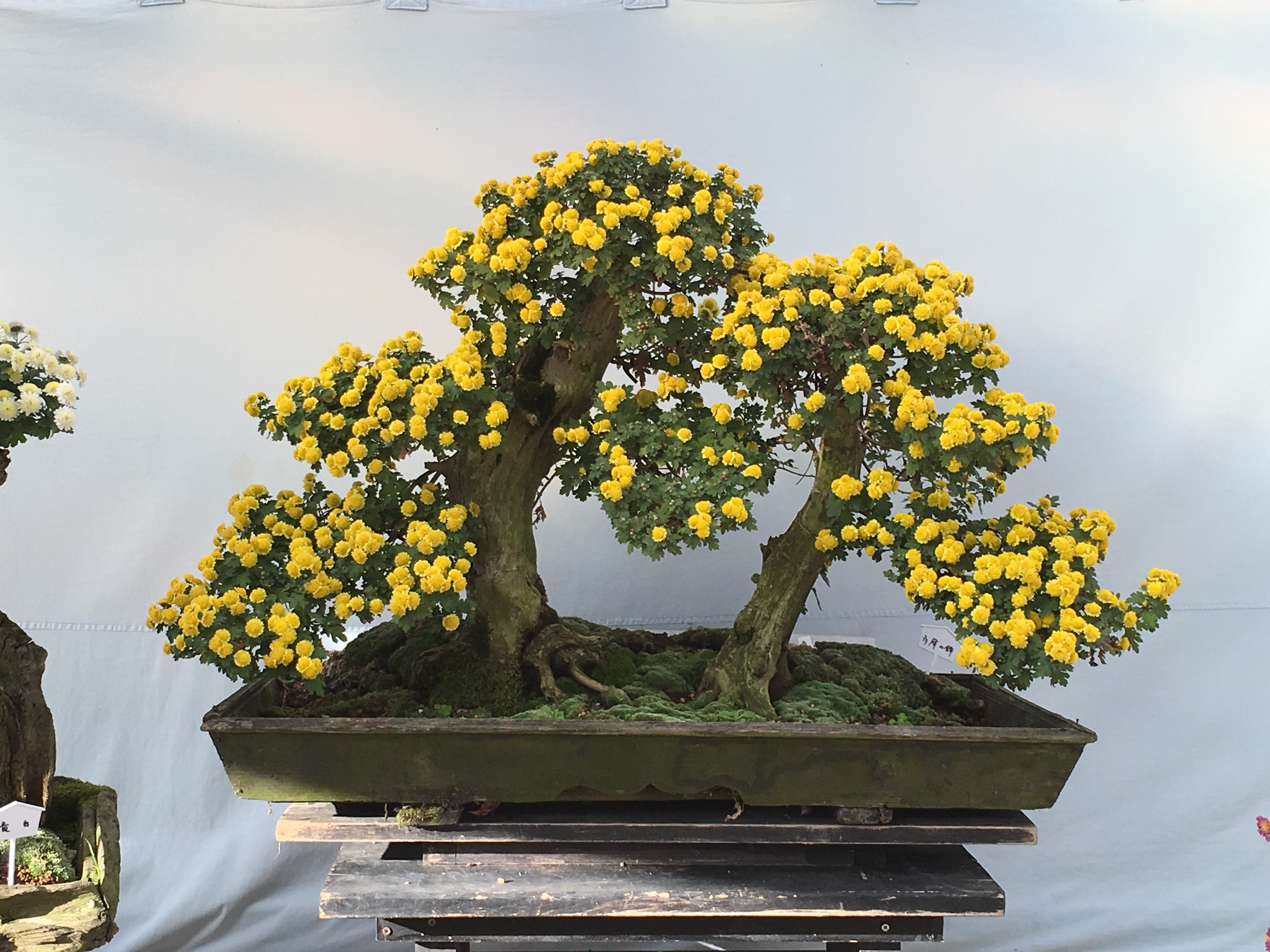
Chrysanthemum bonsai forest style at the Nagoya Castle Chrysanthemum Competition 2017

Chrysanthemum bonsai (Japanese: 菊の盆栽, romanized: Kiku no bonsai, lit. 'Chrysanthemum tray planting',) is a Japanese art form using cultivation techniques to produce, in containers, chrysanthemum flowers that mimic the shape and scale of full size trees, called bonsai.

== Cultivation and care ==
Bonsai cultivation and care requires techniques and tools that are specialized to support the growth and maintenance of the flowers in small containers. There are several cultivated varieties of chrysanthemum that possess the ability to be trained into many of the traditional bonsai styles associated with woody trunked trees and shrubs. But since chrysanthemums rarely grow to be old enough to have wood, deadwood bonsai techniques may also be used.

Chrysanthemums are perennials, and while it is possible to keep a chrysanthemum bonsai alive for a number of years (old wood), it is more likely that the bonsai will be 'finished' after all the blooms have faded.

The chrysanthemum bonsai artist must complete all design work in fewer than ten months. Most chrysanthemum bonsai artists in the northern latitudes of the United States start the training of their bonsai in April, and are finished by the middle of September.

Traditionally in Japan the Chrysanthemum exhibitions showcase the different bonsai forms. This takes place in autumn around the months of October and November.

== Styles ==
Various bonsai styles exist, such as the cascade style, the clinging to a rock style, and the forest style.

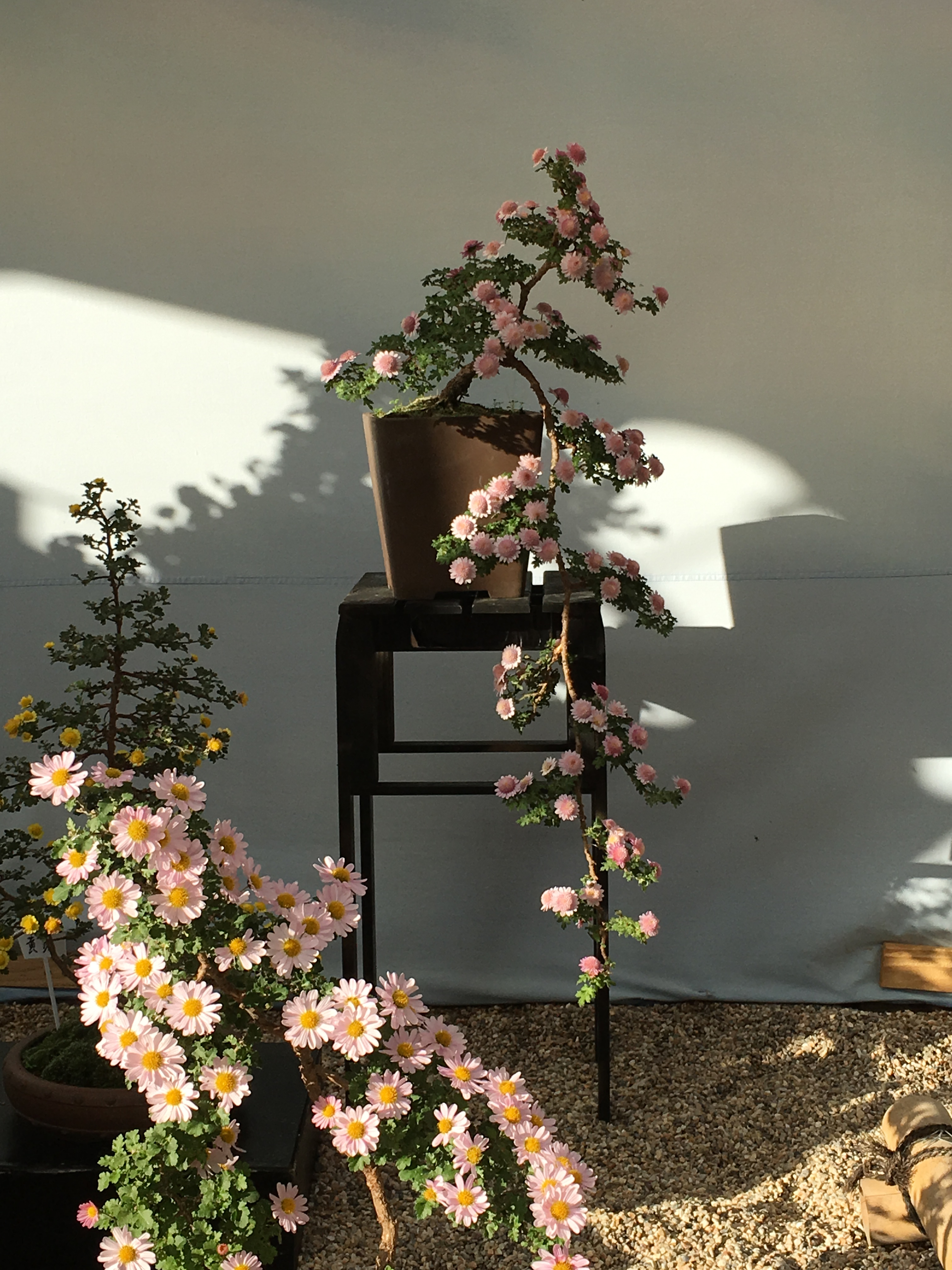
Cascade style

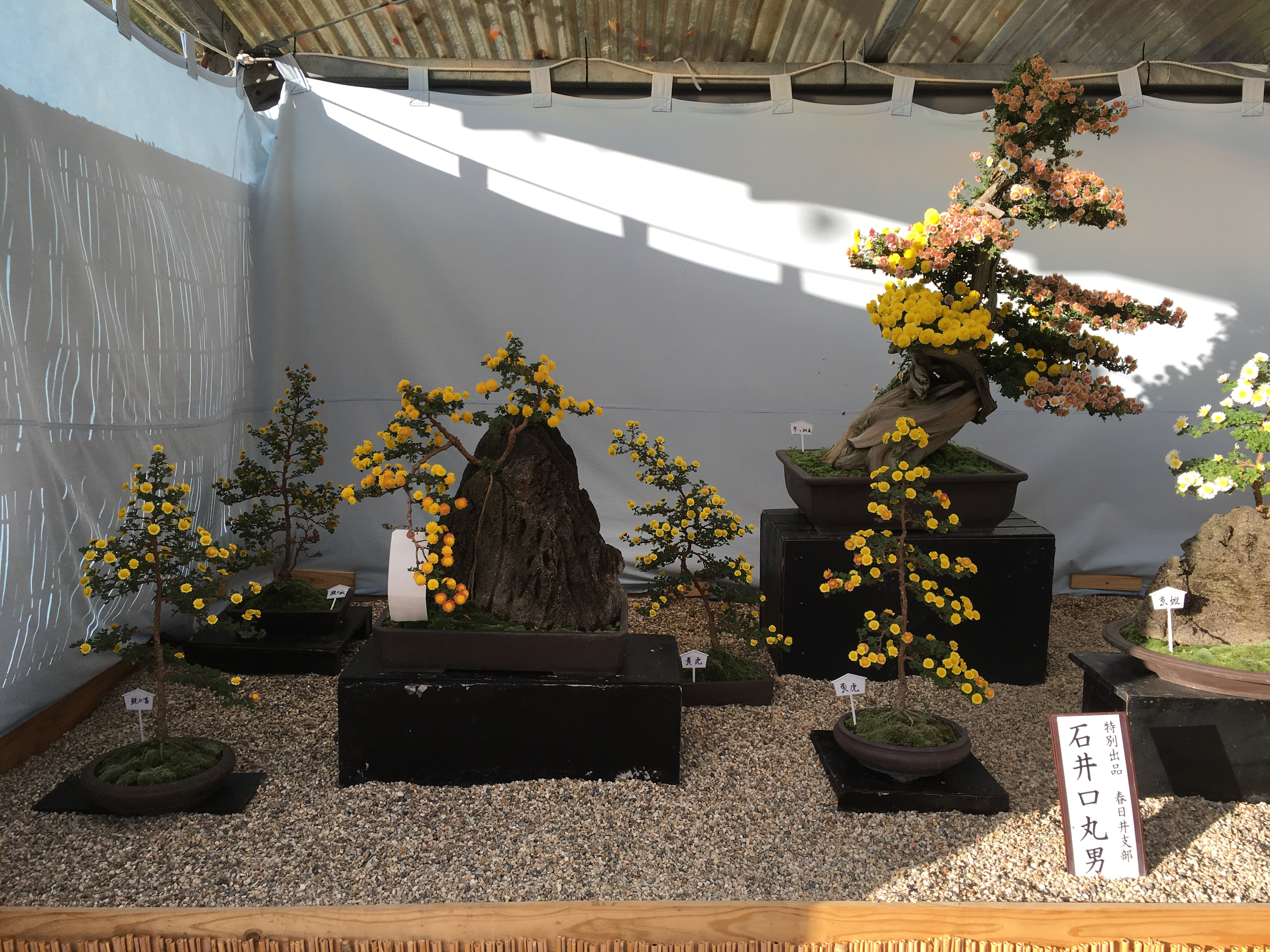
Clinging to a rock style

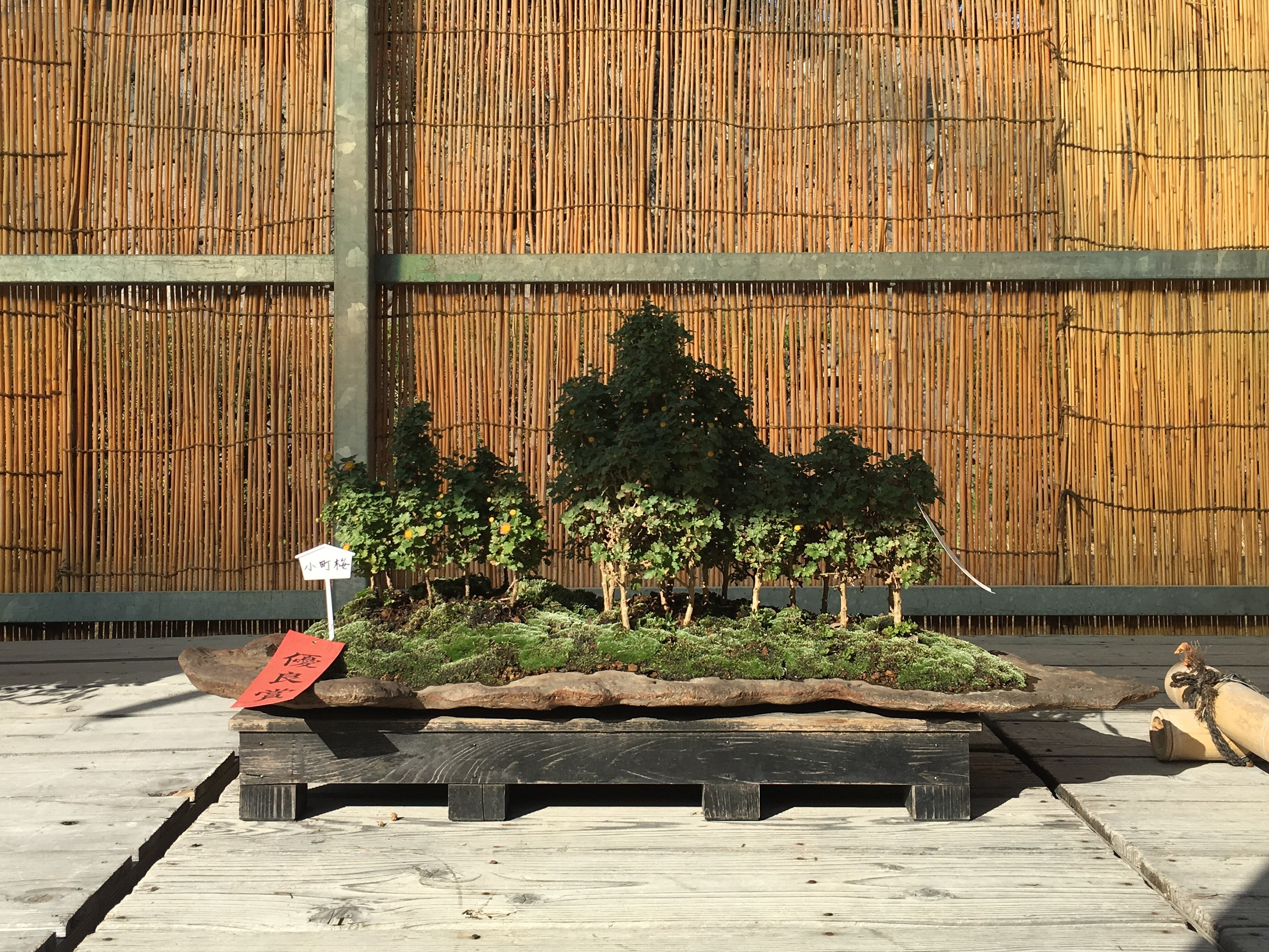
Forest style

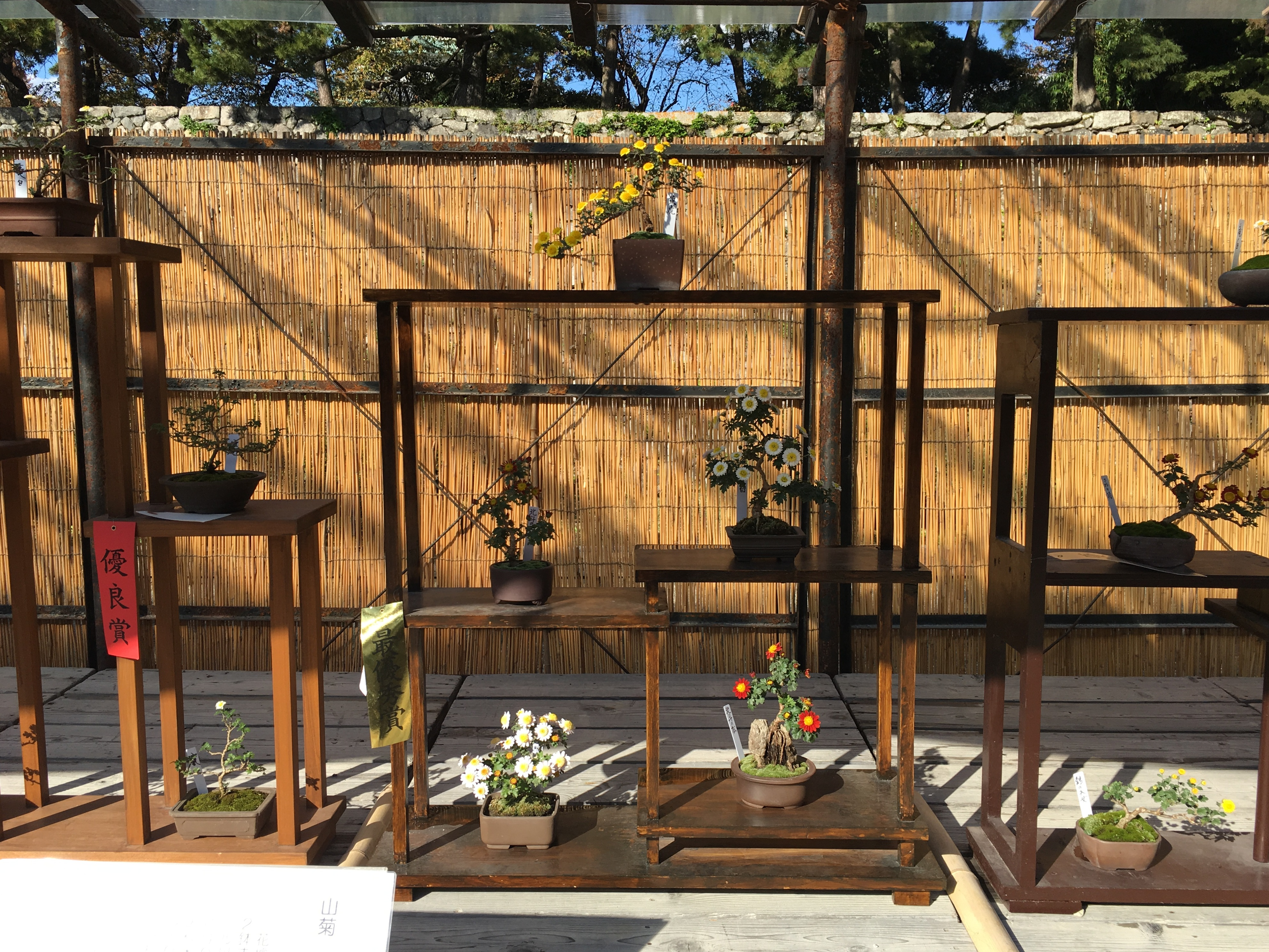
Various other smaller pieces

== See also ==
- List of species used in bonsai

== Bibliography ==
- Tameji Nakajima, H. Carl Young. The art of the chrysanthemum: Japanese techniques for creating bonsai, cascades, giants and other potted styles. Harper & Row (1965)
