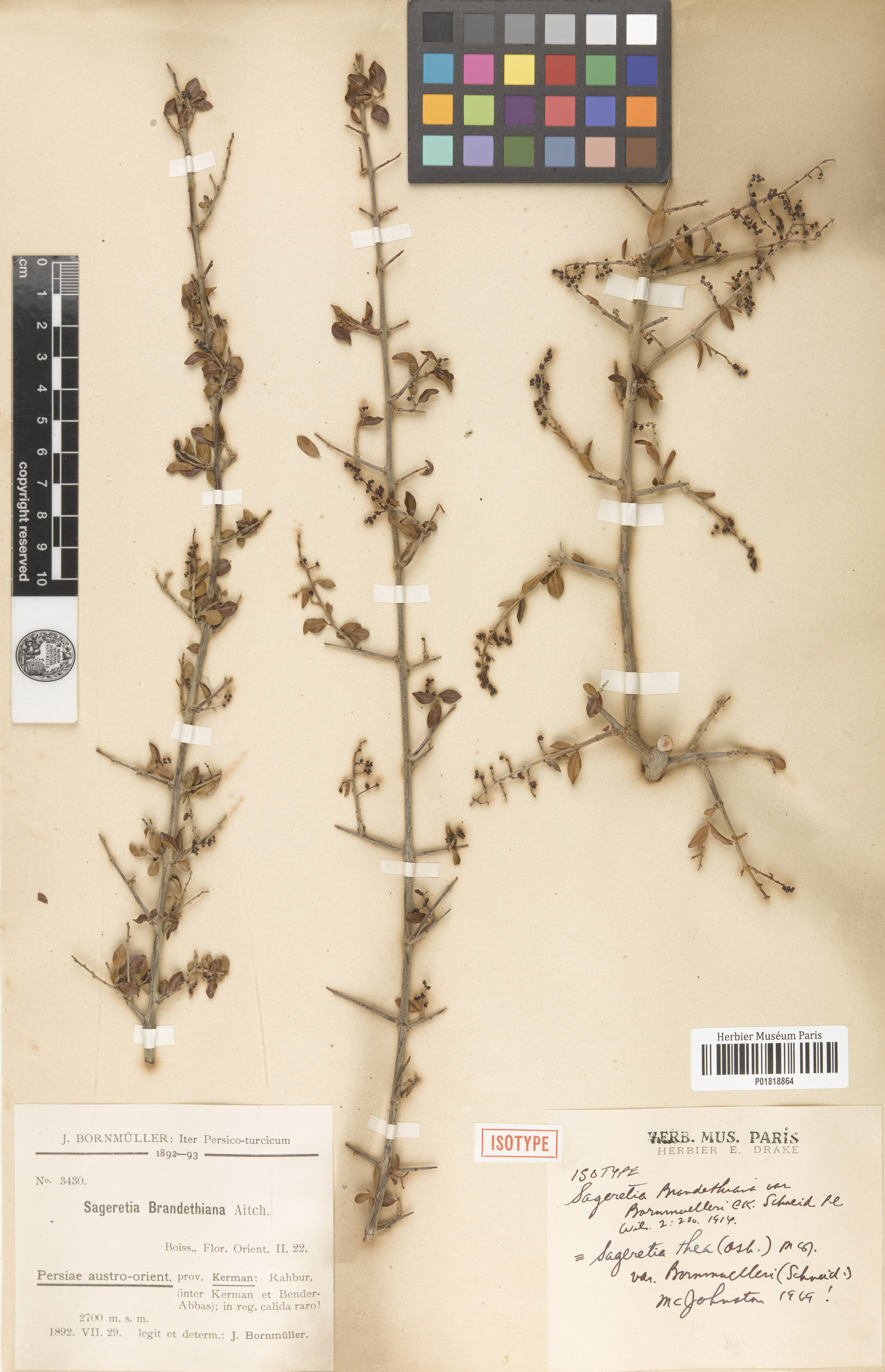

Scientific classification
- Kingdom: Plantae
- Clade: Tracheophytes
- Clade: Angiosperms
- Clade: Eudicots
- Clade: Rosids
- Order: Rosales
- Family: Rhamnaceae
- Genus: Sageretia
- Species: S. brandrethiana

Binomial name
- Sageretia brandrethiana Aitch.

= Sageretia brandrethiana =

Species of plant

Sageretia brandrethiana is a plant of the genus Sageretia and the family Rhamnaceae. It grows in the orient and northwest India. The plant produces a sweet fruit that is prized by the Afghans.
