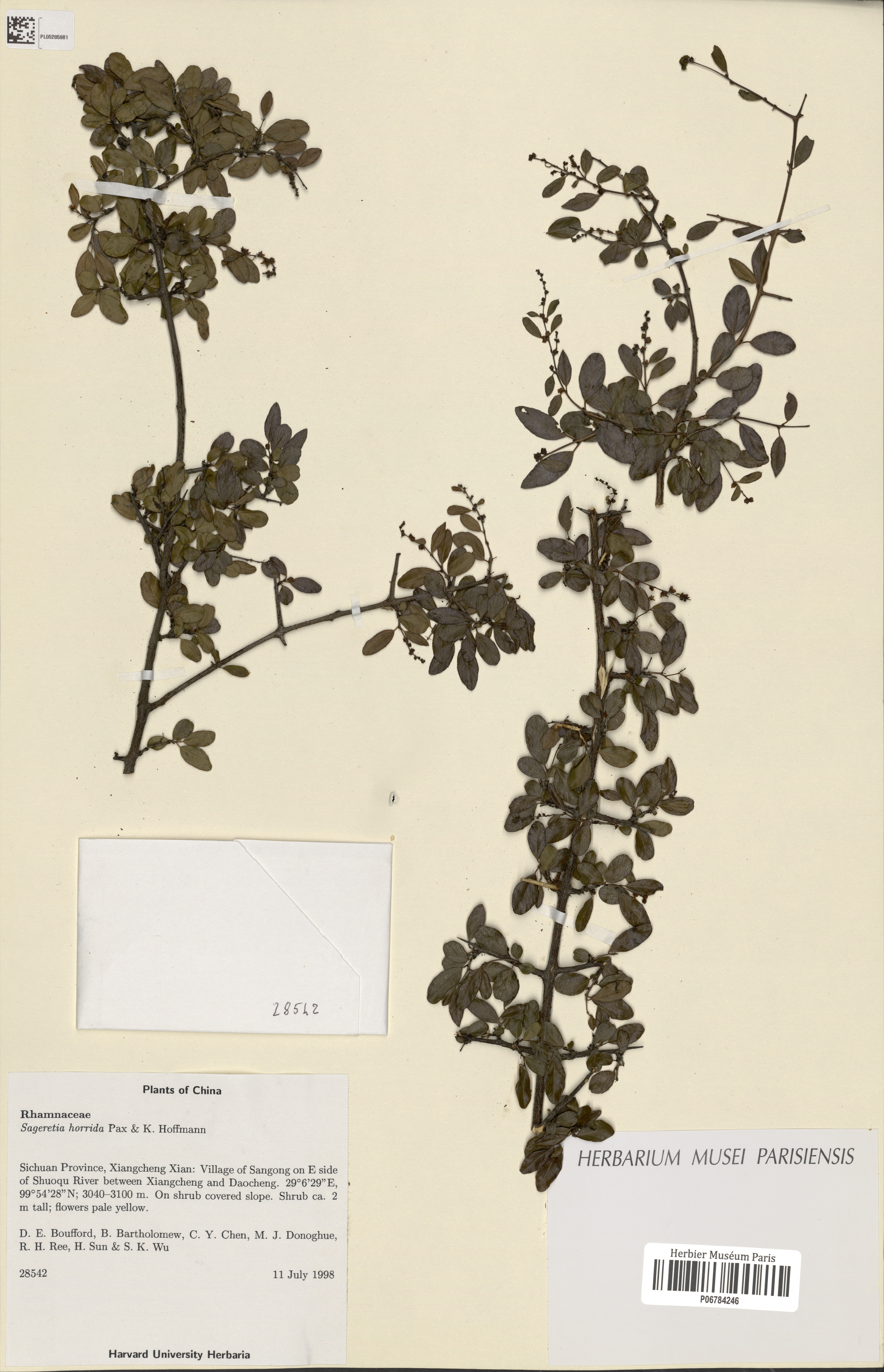

Scientific classification
- Kingdom: Plantae
- Clade: Tracheophytes
- Clade: Angiosperms
- Clade: Eudicots
- Clade: Rosids
- Order: Rosales
- Family: Rhamnaceae
- Genus: Sageretia
- Species: S. horrida

Binomial name
- Sageretia horrida Pax & K.Hoffm.

= Sageretia horrida =

Species of shrub

Sageretia horrida is a flowering plant in the family Rhamnaceae. It is a 3m tall erect shrub with short branchlets and red-brown spines. It is found on forest margins on mountains and stony slopes between 1900 and 3600 m in W Sichuan, E Xizang, NW Yunnan, China.
