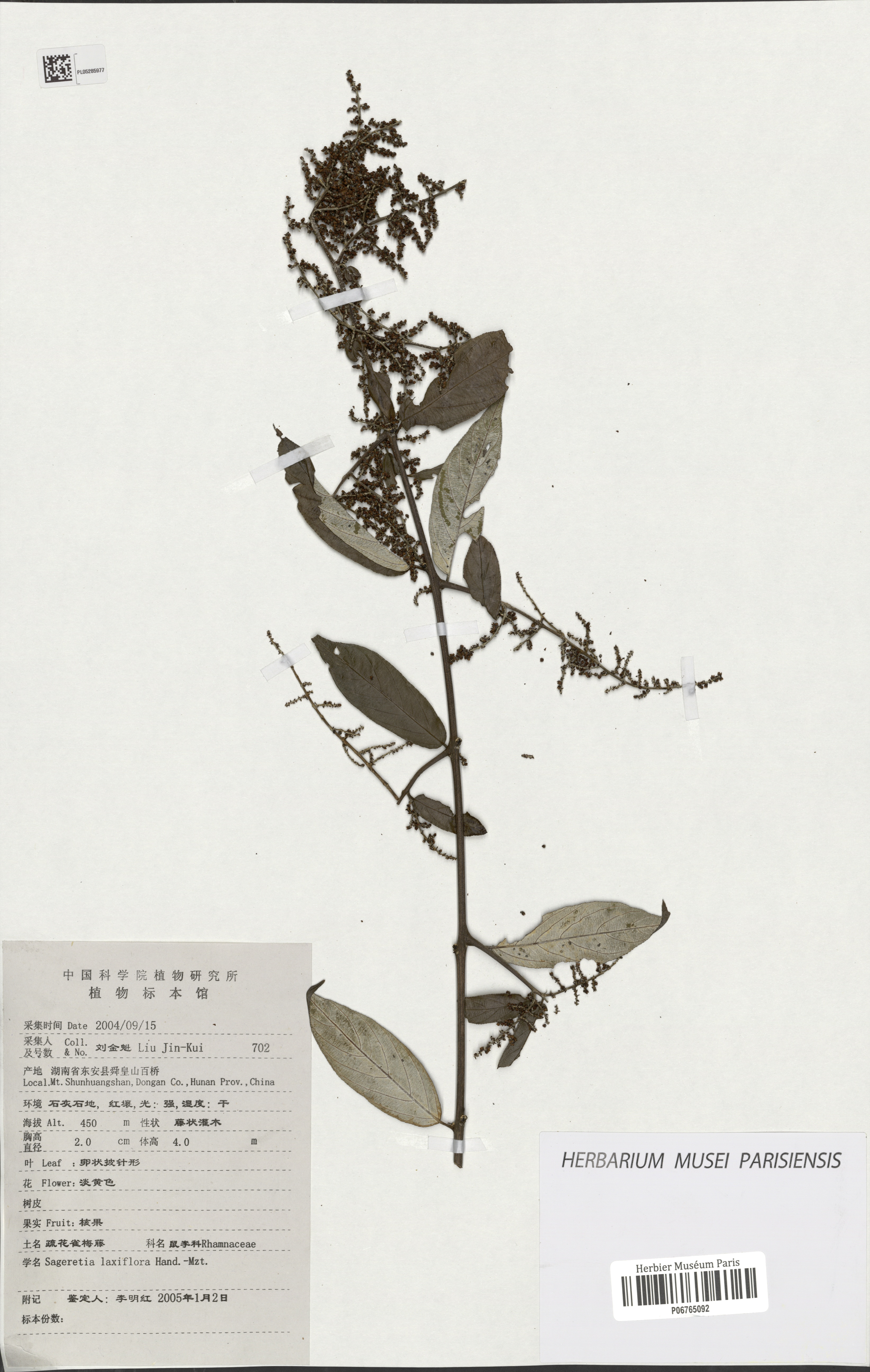

Conservation status
- Least Concern (IUCN 3.1)

Scientific classification
- Kingdom: Plantae
- Clade: Tracheophytes
- Clade: Angiosperms
- Clade: Eudicots
- Clade: Rosids
- Order: Rosales
- Family: Rhamnaceae
- Genus: Sageretia
- Species: S. laxiflora

Binomial name
- Sageretia laxiflora Hand.-Mazz.

= Sageretia laxiflora =

Species of shrub

Sageretia laxiflora is species of flowering plant in the family Rhamnaceae. It a climbing shrub or small tree up to 10m tall. The branchlets have yellow or white tomentose, while the older branches have stout spines. It is native to western Guangxi and southern Guizhou provinces in southern China, where grows in thickets on slopes and in grasslands up to 700 m elevation.

The species was described by Heinrich von Handel-Mazzetti in 1933.
