= Sageretia camellifolia =

Scientific classification
- Kingdom: Plantae
- Clade: Tracheophytes
- Clade: Angiosperms
- Clade: Eudicots
- Clade: Rosids
- Order: Rosales
- Family: Rhamnaceae
- Genus: Sageretia
- Species: S. camellifolia

Binomial name
- Sageretia camellifolia Y.L.Chen & P.K.Chou

Species of shrub

Sageretia camellifolia is a shrub growing to 4m in height. It has brown-grey branchlets with green shiny leaves. It grows in sparse forests or thickets on top of limestone hills, and can be found in West Guangxi, China.
