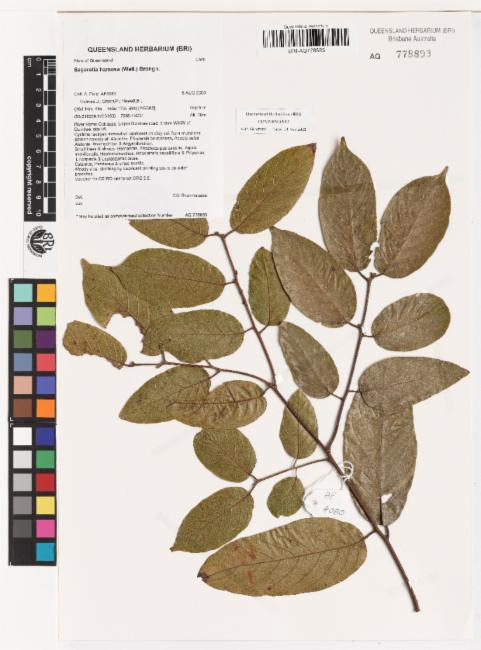
- Habit

Conservation status
- Least Concern (NCA)

Scientific classification
- Kingdom: Plantae
- Clade: Embryophytes
- Clade: Tracheophytes
- Clade: Spermatophytes
- Clade: Angiosperms
- Clade: Eudicots
- Clade: Rosids
- Order: Rosales
- Family: Rhamnaceae
- Genus: Sageretia
- Species: S. hamosa

Binomial name
- Sageretia hamosa (Wall.) Brongn.

Synonyms
- Ziziphus hamosa Wall.

= Sageretia hamosa =

Species of flowering plant

Sageretia hamosa is a climbing plant in the family Rhamnaceae native to areas from India to southern China, the Philippines, Malesia and the state of Queensland in Australia.

== Description ==
It is a scrambling shrub or vine with a stem diameter up to 8 cm (3 in). Stout recurved hooks occur on the stems and branches. Leaves are arranged alternately and can reach up to 18 cm (7 in) long and 7 cm (2.8 in) long. They have eight to ten lateral veins on either side of the midrib, and very small teeth on the margins.

Flowers are about 2 mm (0.08 in) diameter and are borne on inflorescences about 15 cm (6 in) long. The fruits are dark red or purple to black drupes measuring up to about 12 mm (0.5 in) diameter, and containing one or two seeds.

== Distribution and habitat ==
Sageretia hamosa grows in rainforest and monsoon forest, at altitudes below 1,600 m (5,200 ft). It is native to India, Assam, Tibet, Nepal, Sri Lanka, China South-Central, China Southeast, Myanmar, Vietnam, Philippines, Lesser Sunda Islands and Queensland.

== Taxonomy ==
Two varieties are recognised: Sageretia hamosa var. trichoclada, which is endemic to Yunnan Province in China, and the autonym Sageretia hamosa var. hamosa.

== Conservation status ==
This species is listed as least concern under the Queensland Government's Nature Conservation Act. As of July 2026, it has not been assessed by the International Union for Conservation of Nature.
