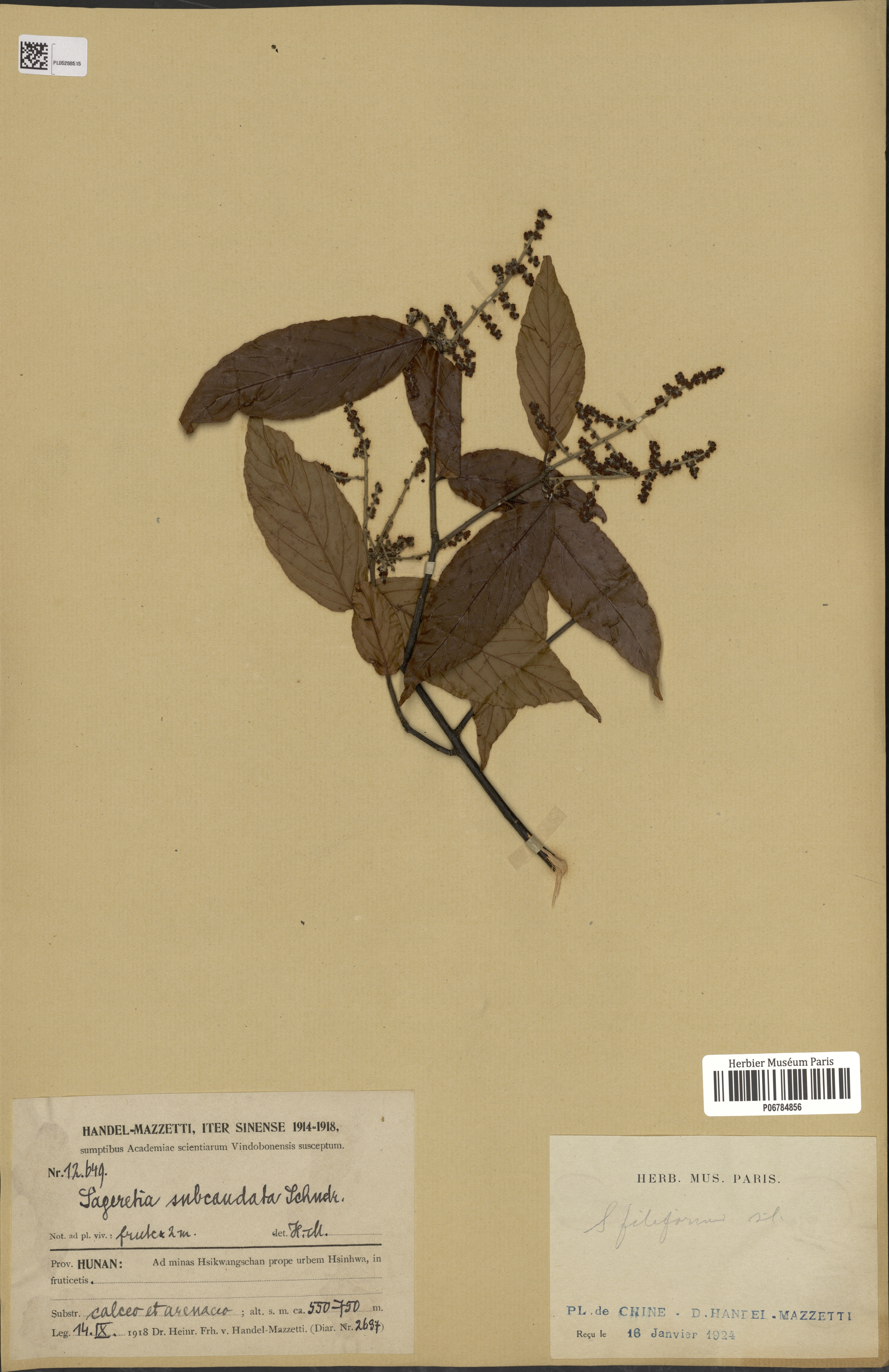

Scientific classification
- Kingdom: Plantae
- Clade: Tracheophytes
- Clade: Angiosperms
- Clade: Eudicots
- Clade: Rosids
- Order: Rosales
- Family: Rhamnaceae
- Genus: Sageretia
- Species: S. subcaudata

Binomial name
- Sageretia subcaudata C.K.Schneid.

= Sageretia subcaudata =

Species of shrub

Sageretia subcaudata is a small woody shrub reaching a height of 1.5 metres (4 ft 11 in). It has green, ovate leaves and white-yellow or white flowers. The shrub is endemic to China and found in mountain forests and thickets of N Guangdong, Guizhou, W Henan, Hubei, Hunan, Jiangxi, S Shaanxi, E Sichuan, Tibet, and Yunnan provinces.
