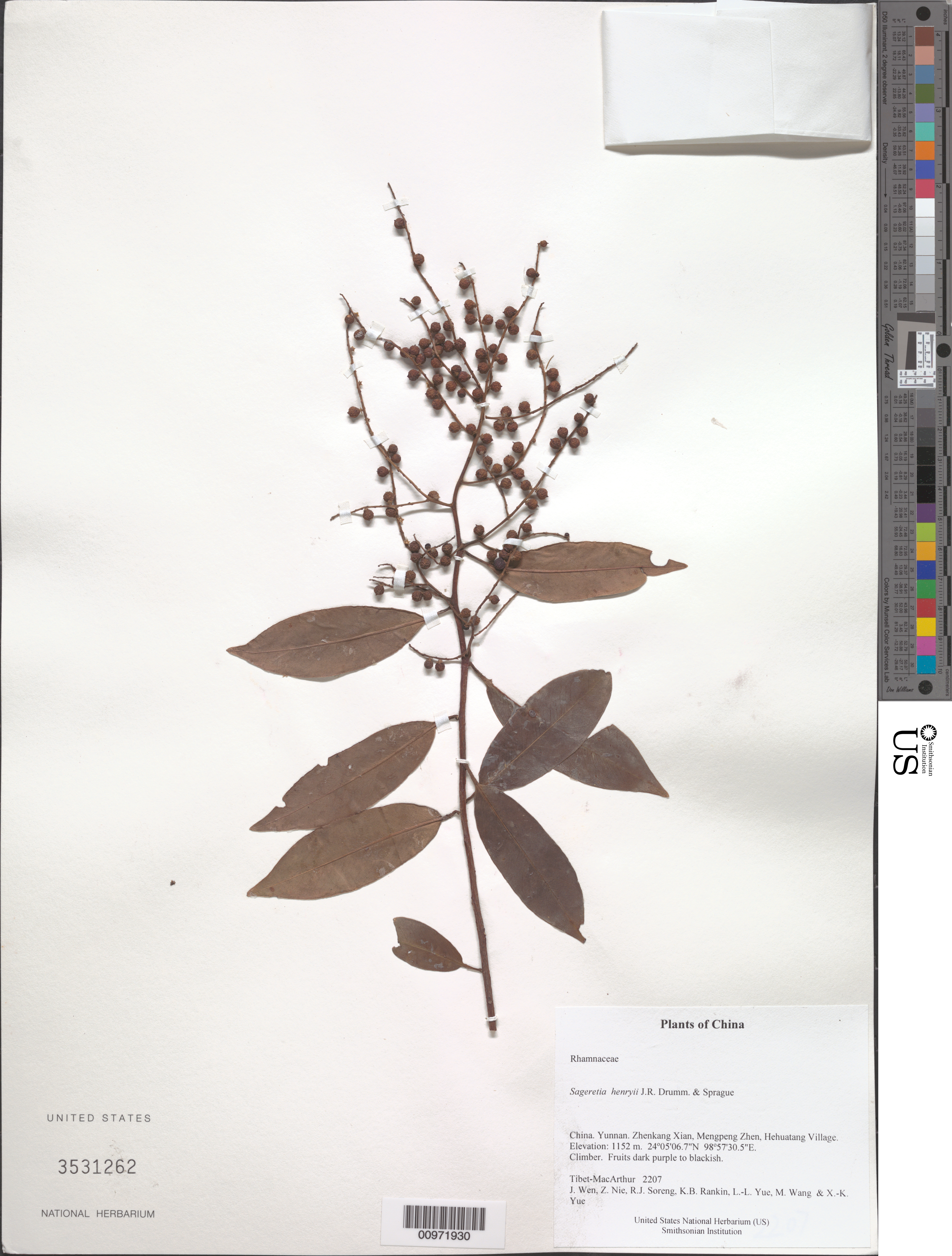

Scientific classification
- Kingdom: Plantae
- Clade: Tracheophytes
- Clade: Angiosperms
- Clade: Eudicots
- Clade: Rosids
- Order: Rosales
- Family: Rhamnaceae
- Genus: Sageretia
- Species: S. henryi

Binomial name
- Sageretia henryi J.R.Drumm. & Sprague

Synonyms
- Berchemia cavaleriei H.Lév.; Sageretia cavaleriei (H.Lév.) C.K.Schneid.

= Sageretia henryi =

Species of shrub

Sageretia henryi is a species of flowering plant in the family Rhamnaceae. It is a woody shrub reaching a height of 2.5 metres (8 ft 2 in), sometimes although growing to the size of a small tree. It has green, ovate leaves and yellow or white flowers. The shrub is found in mountain thickets and dense forests of China in the Gansu, Guangxi, Guizhou, Hubei, Hunan, Shaanxi, Sichuan, Yunnan S Zhejiang.
