= Sageretia lucida =

Scientific classification
- Kingdom: Plantae
- Clade: Tracheophytes
- Clade: Angiosperms
- Clade: Eudicots
- Clade: Rosids
- Order: Rosales
- Family: Rhamnaceae
- Genus: Sageretia
- Species: S. lucida

Binomial name
- Sageretia lucida Merr.

Species of shrub

Sageretia lucida is a shrub and can be found with or without spines. It is found in sparse forests within valleys about 300 to 800 m in elevation. Its native distribution is south-central China, southeast China including Hainan, Nepal, Sri Lanka and Vietnam.
