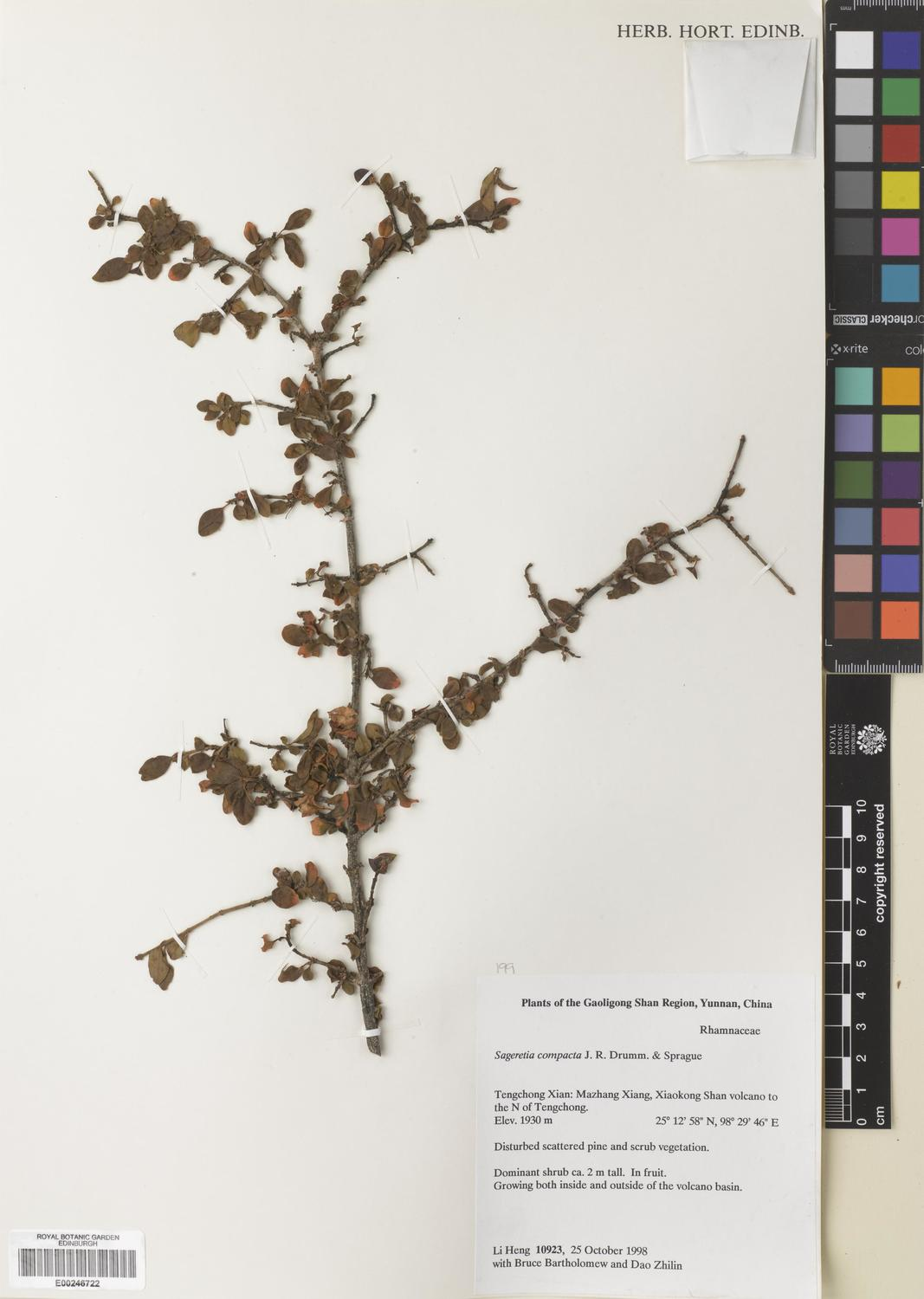

Scientific classification
- Kingdom: Plantae
- Clade: Tracheophytes
- Clade: Angiosperms
- Clade: Eudicots
- Clade: Rosids
- Order: Rosales
- Family: Rhamnaceae
- Genus: Sageretia
- Species: S. gracilis

Binomial name
- Sageretia gracilis J.R.Drumm. & Sprague

Synonyms
- Sageretia apiculata C.K.Schneid.; Sageretia compacta J.R.Drumm. & Sprague

= Sageretia gracilis =

Species of shrub

Sageretia gracilis is a species of flowering plant in the family Rhamnaceae. It is a shrub with slightly shiny dark green leaves and yellow-green flowers. It grows in thickets or forests in valleys and on mountains around 1200 to 3400 meters of W Guangxi, east and south east Tibet, and Yunnan, China.
