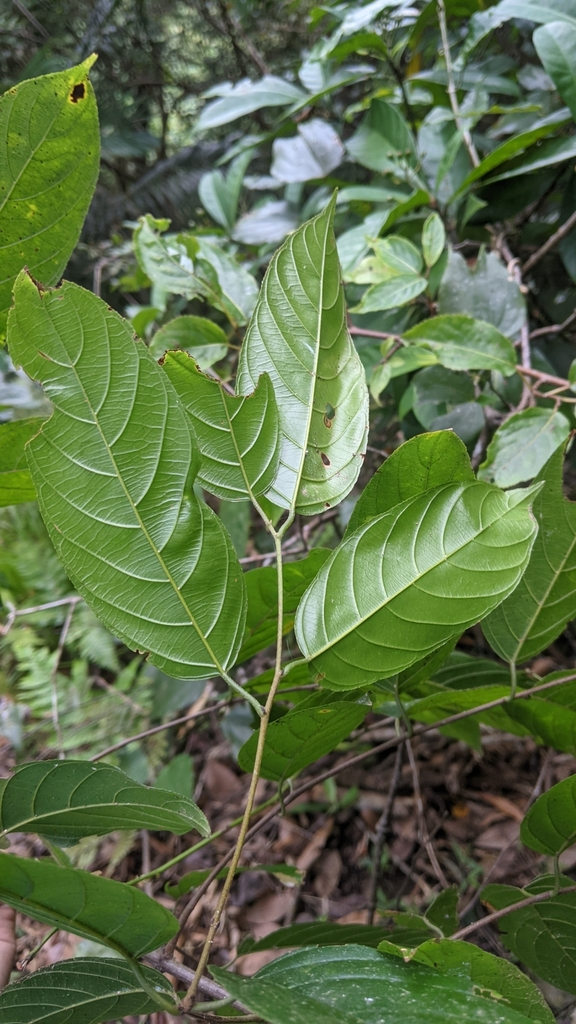

Scientific classification
- Kingdom: Plantae
- Clade: Tracheophytes
- Clade: Angiosperms
- Clade: Eudicots
- Clade: Rosids
- Order: Rosales
- Family: Rhamnaceae
- Genus: Sageretia
- Species: S. randaiensis

Binomial name
- Sageretia randaiensis Hayata

= Sageretia randaiensis =

Species of shrub

Sageretia randaiensis is a small woody shrub. It has dark green, ovate-oblong leaves. The shrub is found in the mountains of C and N Taiwan.
