= Chrysanthemum exhibition =

Flower show in Japan

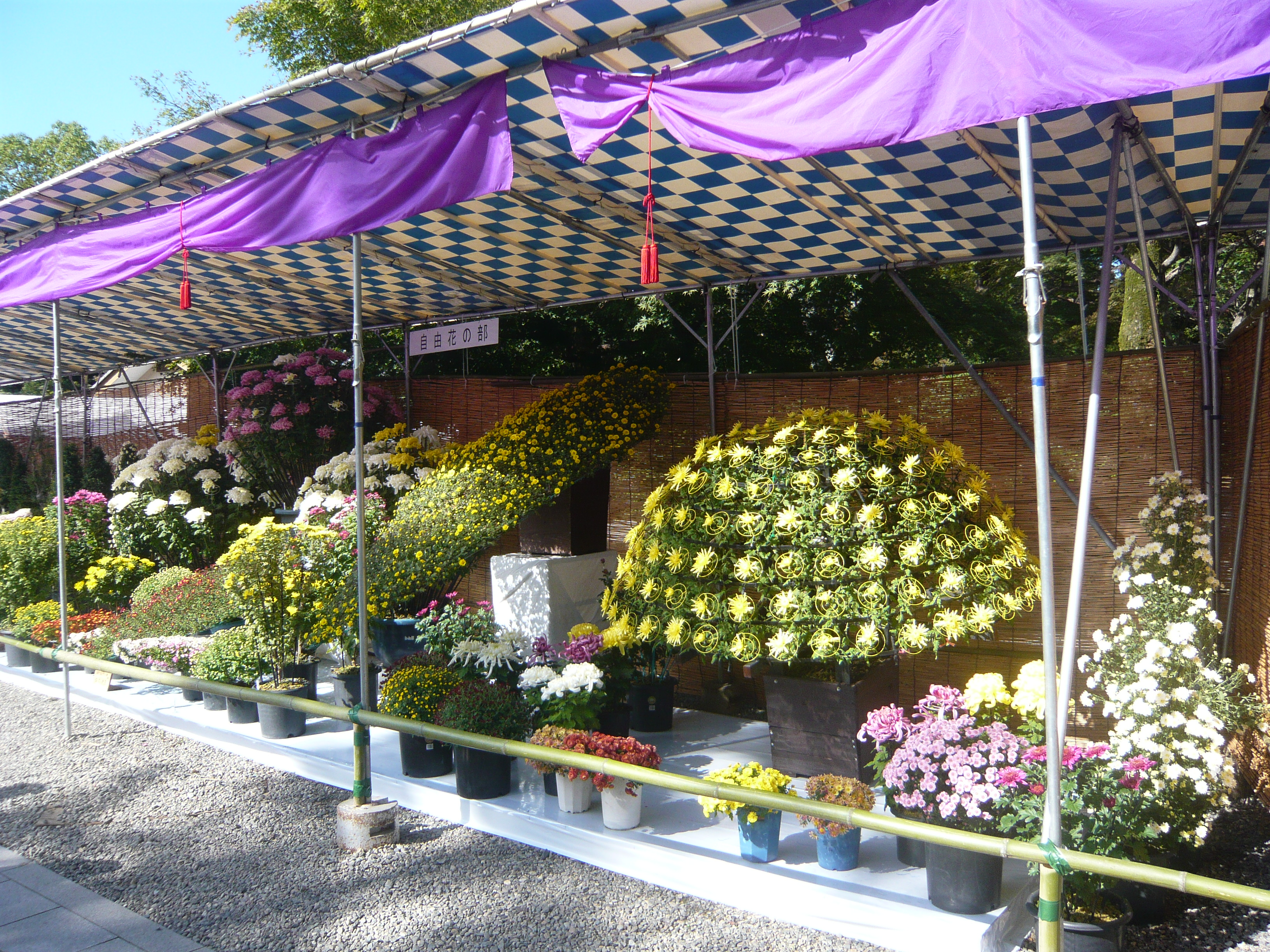
Chrysanthemum Doll and Flower Festival in Gifu (2007)

A chrysanthemum exhibition (菊花展覧会 Kikatenrankai) is a flower show that takes place in various parts of Japan every autumn from October to November. Other terms used are also “Chrysanthemum Festival” or “Chrysanthemum Competition”.

== History ==
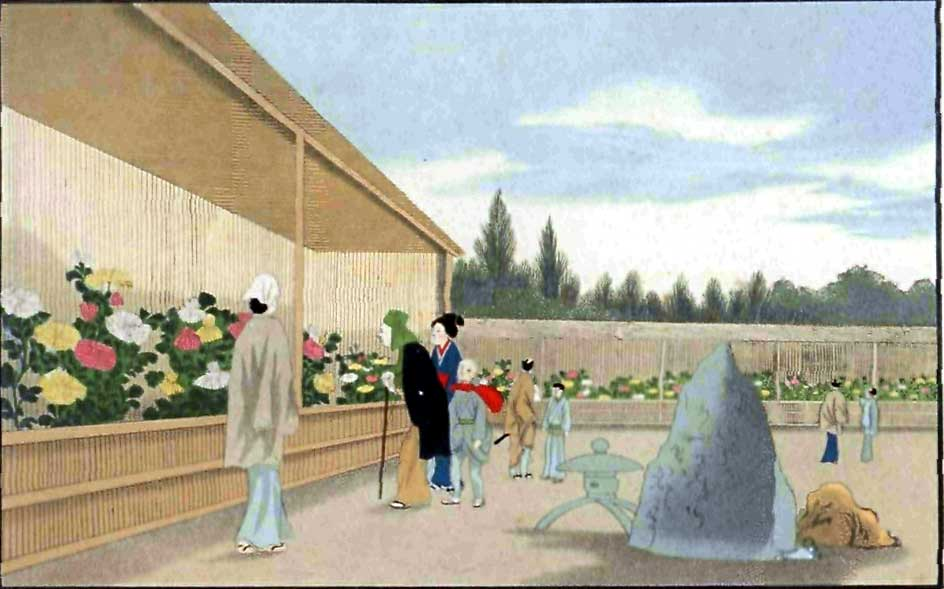
Drawing of a chrysanthemum show (from "Sketches of Japanese Manners and Customs", by J. M. W. Silver, 1867)

Chrysanthemums first arrived in Japan by way of China in the 5th century. By the Heian period, the flower was cultivated throughout Japan. It represented the noble class and the season of autumn, and the Japanese even had a Chrysanthemum festival. When the flower was adopted for the Imperial Seal of Japan some families also cultivated it to signal their support and good relationship with the Imperial family.

These flowers are much esteemed by the Japanese, who pay more attention to size and brilliancy of colour than to perfume.

== Main exhibits ==
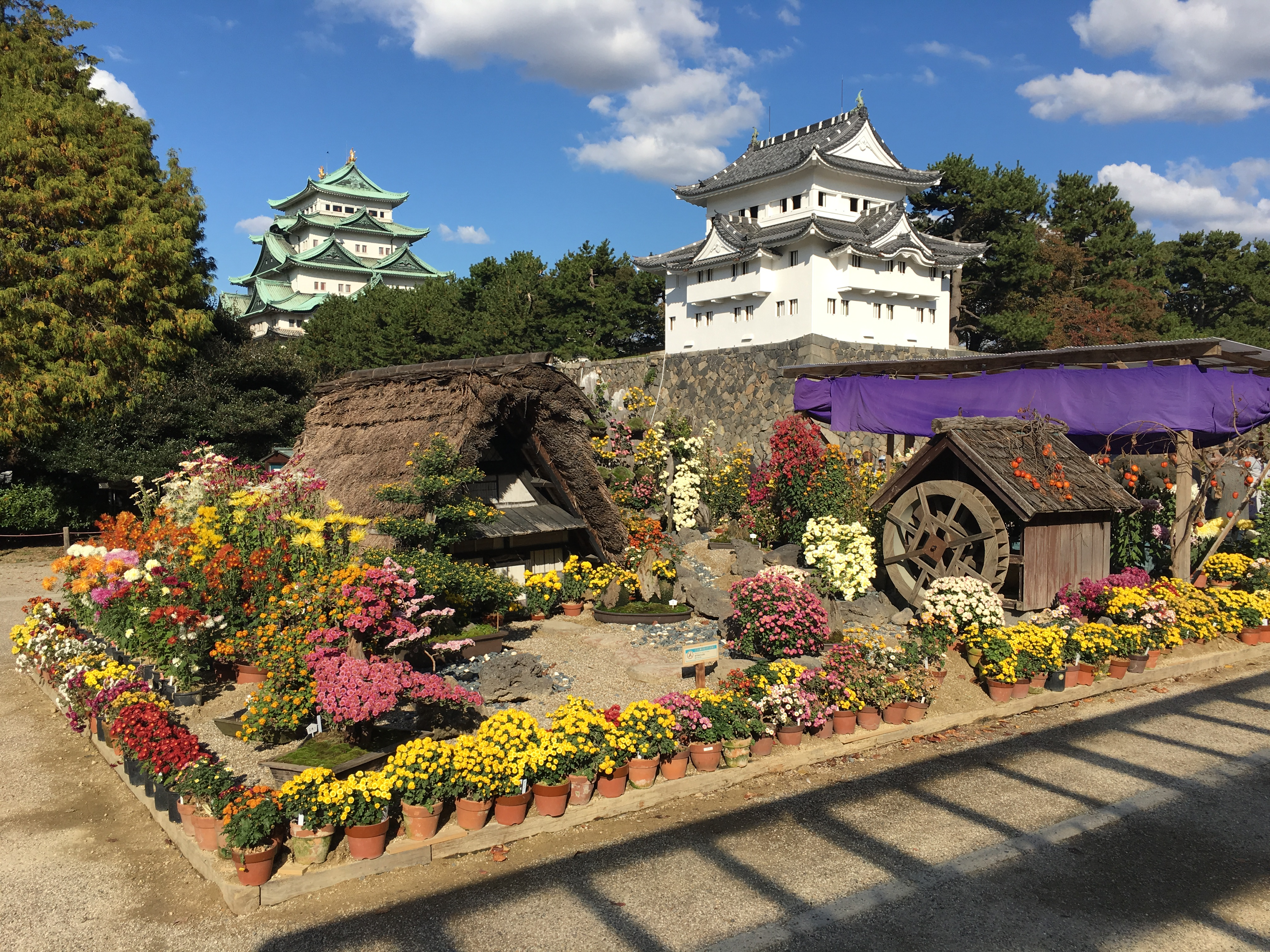
Nagoya Castle Chrysanthemum Competition with miniature landscape (2018)

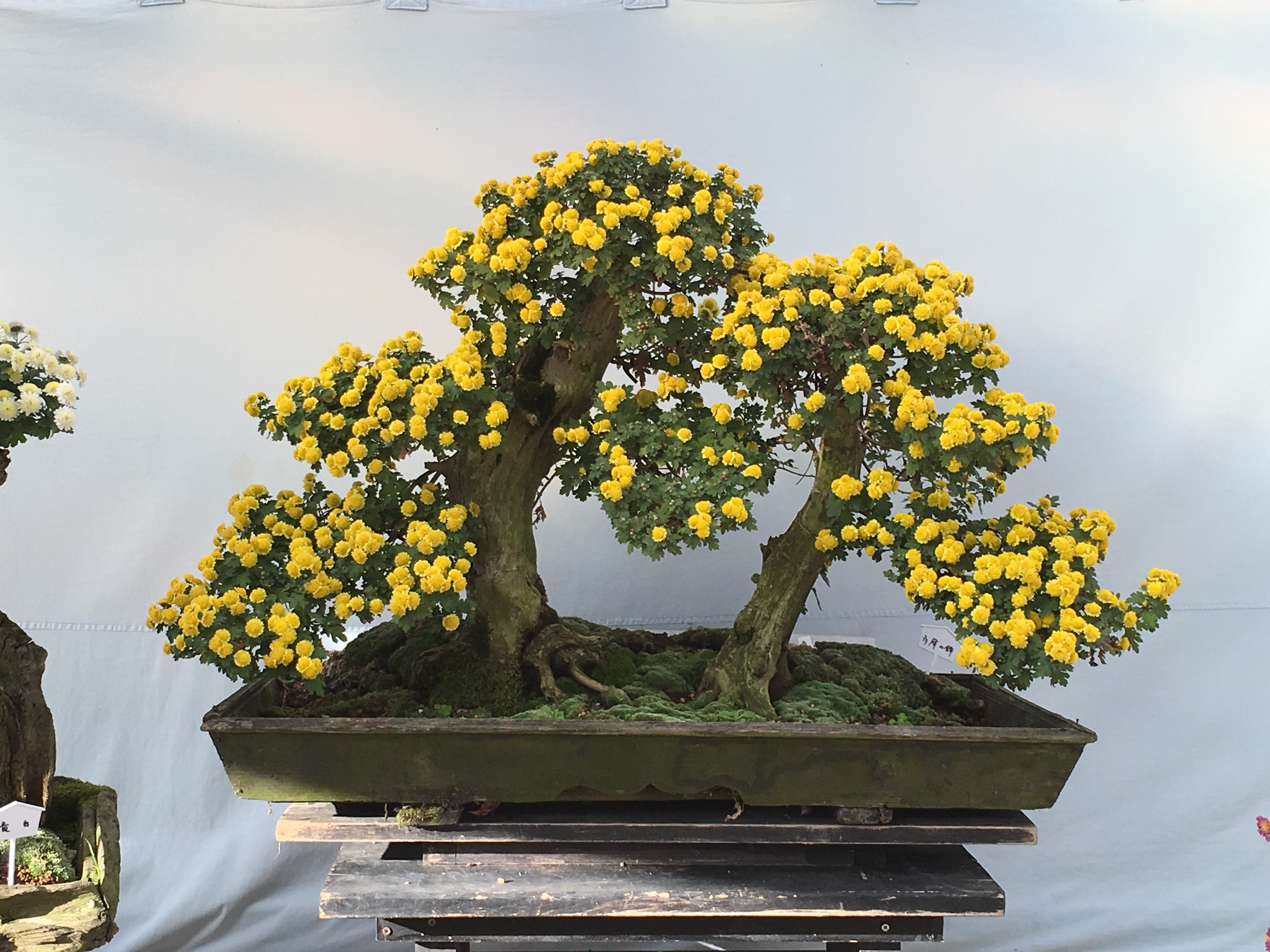
Chrysanthemum bonsai at the Nagoya Castle Chrysanthemum Competition 2017

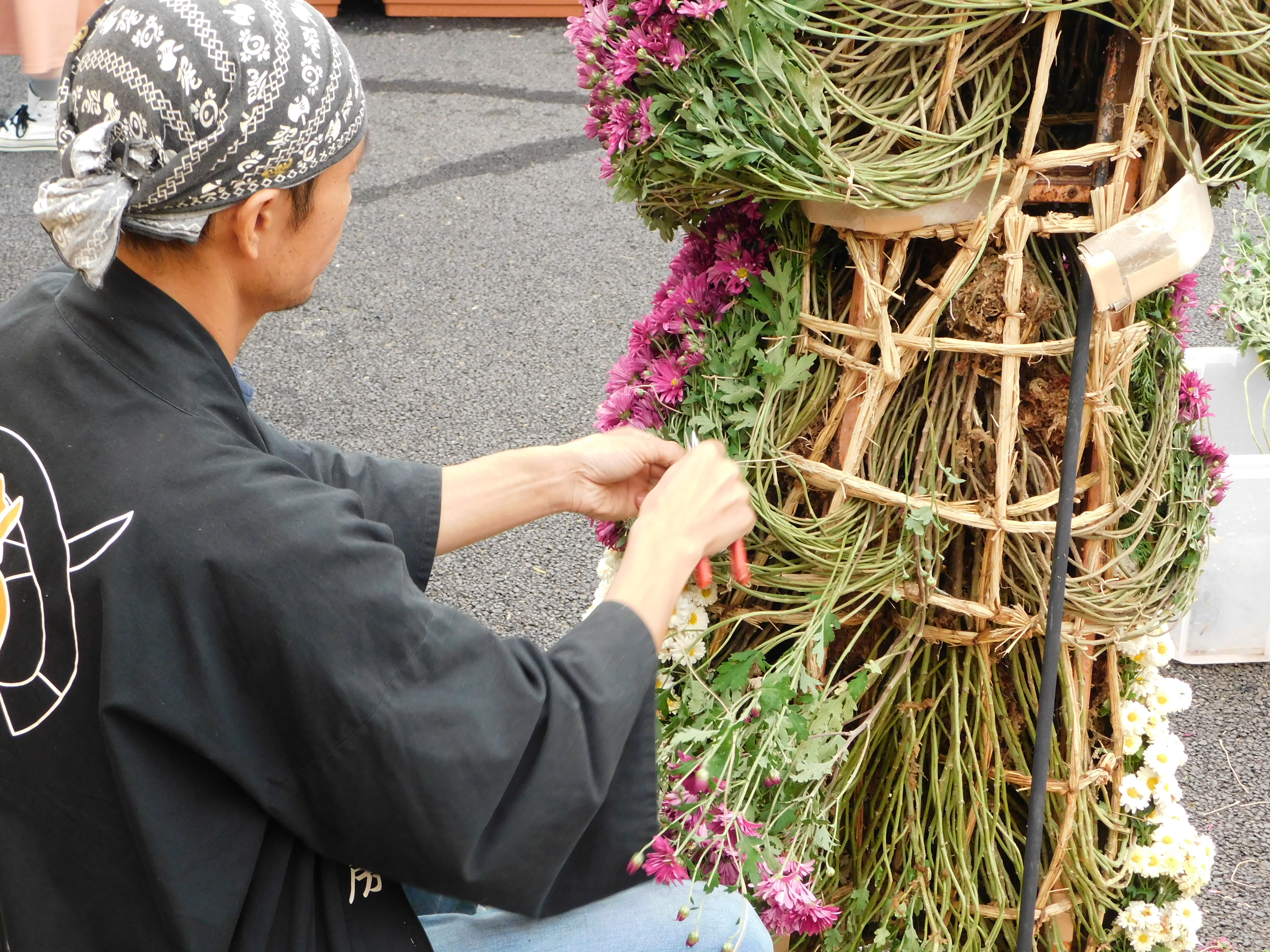
Craftsman creating a chrysanthemum doll

Exhibitions show works by individuals or groups. They tend to feature:

- Large chrysanthemums
  - Single chrysanthemum grown from one seedling
  - Three-tailoring - a technique of pinching one seedling and branching it into three. The flowers are supported by wheels
  - Seven-tailoring - a technique to pinch one seedling and branch it into seven. The flowers are supported by a raised centre wheel and surrounding six lower wheels.
- Chrysanthemum bonsai techniques
  - Diorama scenes using stones, figurines, etc.
  - Suspended cliff tailoring - a technique in which a trunk hangs down a cliff and expresses the appearance of a growing tree
  - Front cascade small cliff - a method of tailoring a cliff tail to the front, pinching a single seedling and branching a lot
  - Front cascade large cliff - a technique to make more branches and branches
- Chrysanthemum dolls (kiku ningyo) - a representation of a person or animal as a motif
- Chrysanthemum flower beds

== Reviews and awards ==
The flowers and installations are comprehensively examined by their size, shape of flowers and leaves, and the harm of insects. Bonsai will be examined for roots and trunks, which should gradually become thinner from the roots. For other works, the balance, shape, etc. are examined based on certain standards.

Various awards and prizes are given by the national and local government authorities, as well as private ones.

== Exhibitions ==
The national exhibition is the All Japan Chrysanthemum Federation National Convention. The Prince Takamatsu Cup was the highest award until the prince's demise, nowadays the highest award is the Prime Minister's Prize. Each time, a new variety is announced with a flower name associated with the venue and is designated as a designated competition flower. There are about 15 divisions and 50 categories according to color and genus. Any member of the All-Japan Kikuhana Federation can participate by paying the participation fee.

Apart from the national exhibition various prefectures and cities have their own as well.

- The Nagoya Castle Chrysanthemum Competition started after the end of the Pacific War. The event at the castle has become a tradition for the city. With three categories, it is one of the largest events of its kind in the region by both scale and content. The first category is the exhibition of cultivated flowers. The second category is for bonsai flowers, which are combined with dead pieces of wood to give the illusion of miniature trees. The third category is the creation of miniature landscapes.

== Bibliography ==
- Tameji Nakajima, H. Carl Young. The art of the chrysanthemum: Japanese techniques for creating bonsai, cascades, giants and other potted styles. Harper & Row (1965)
