= Sageretia melliana =

Scientific classification
- Kingdom: Plantae
- Clade: Tracheophytes
- Clade: Angiosperms
- Clade: Eudicots
- Clade: Rosids
- Order: Rosales
- Family: Rhamnaceae
- Genus: Sageretia
- Species: S. melliana

Binomial name
- Sageretia melliana Hand.-Mazz.

Species of shrub

Sageretia melliana is a woody shrub evergreen. It has shiny green, ovate-elliptical leaves and white-yellow or yellow flowers. The shrub is found in the forest and forest margins of China in the Anhui, Fujian, Guangdong, Guangxi, Guizhou, Hubei, Hunan, Jiangxi, SE Yunnan (Xichou), Zhejiang provinces.
