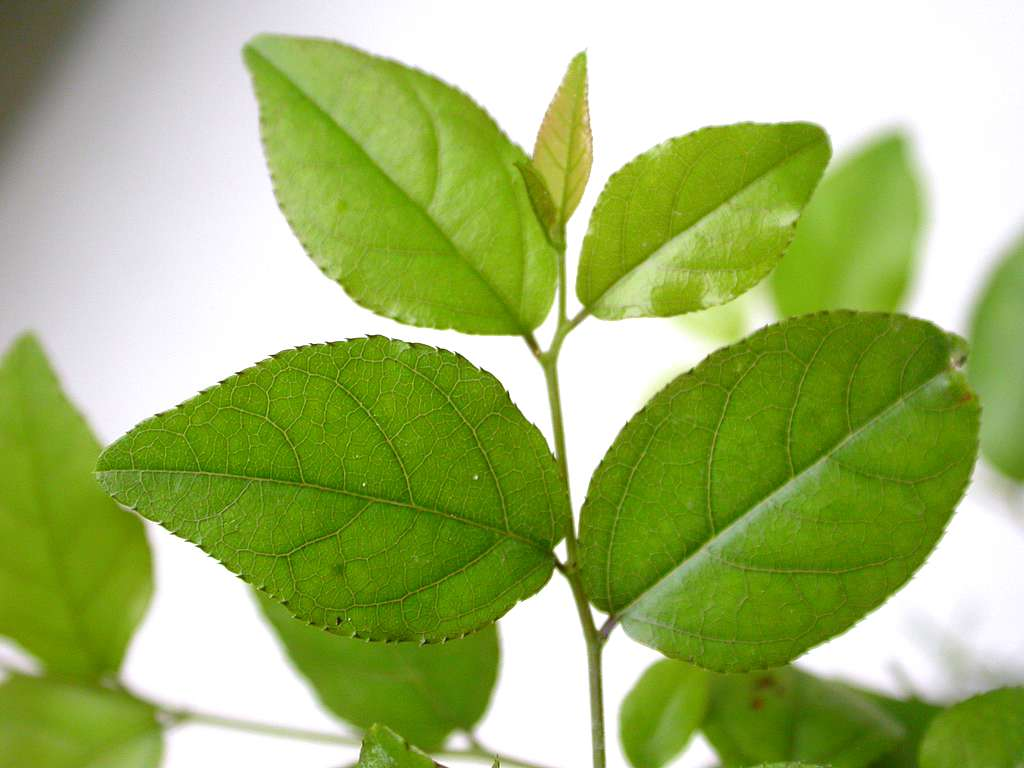
- Sageretia theezans

Scientific classification
- Kingdom: Plantae
- Clade: Tracheophytes
- Clade: Angiosperms
- Clade: Eudicots
- Clade: Rosids
- Order: Rosales
- Family: Rhamnaceae
- Tribe: Rhamneae
- Genus: Sageretia; Brongn.

Species
- See text

= Sageretia =

Family of shrubs and trees

Sageretia (mock buckthorn or sageretia) is a genus of about 35 species of shrubs and small trees in the family Rhamnaceae, native to southern and eastern Asia and northeast Africa. They have small green leaves 1.5–4 cm long, and a leathery multicoloured trunk. The flowers are small and inconspicuous; the fruit is a small edible drupe 1 cm diameter.

The genus is named after the French botanist Augustin Sageret.

Selected species

- Sageretia brandrethiana
- Sageretia camellifolia
- Sageretia filiformis
- Sageretia gracilis
- Sageretia hamosa
- Sageretia henryi
- Sageretia horrida
- Sageretia laxiflora
- Sageretia lucida
- Sageretia melliana
- Sageretia omeiensis
- Sageretia paucicostata
- Sageretia pycnophylla
- Sageretia randaiensis
- Sageretia rugosa
- Sageretia subcaudata
- Sageretia theezans

== Cultivation and uses ==
The leaves are sometimes used as a substitute for tea in China, and the fruit are edible, though not an important crop. S. theezans, from southern China, is a popular species in bonsai. S. paucicostata, from northern China, is the most cold-tolerant species and is occasionally grown in gardens in Europe and North America, though it is not generally considered very attractive as an ornamental plant. It is reputedly used as a way of cleaning minor cuts and lacerations, ensuring any germs left over will not infect the wound.
