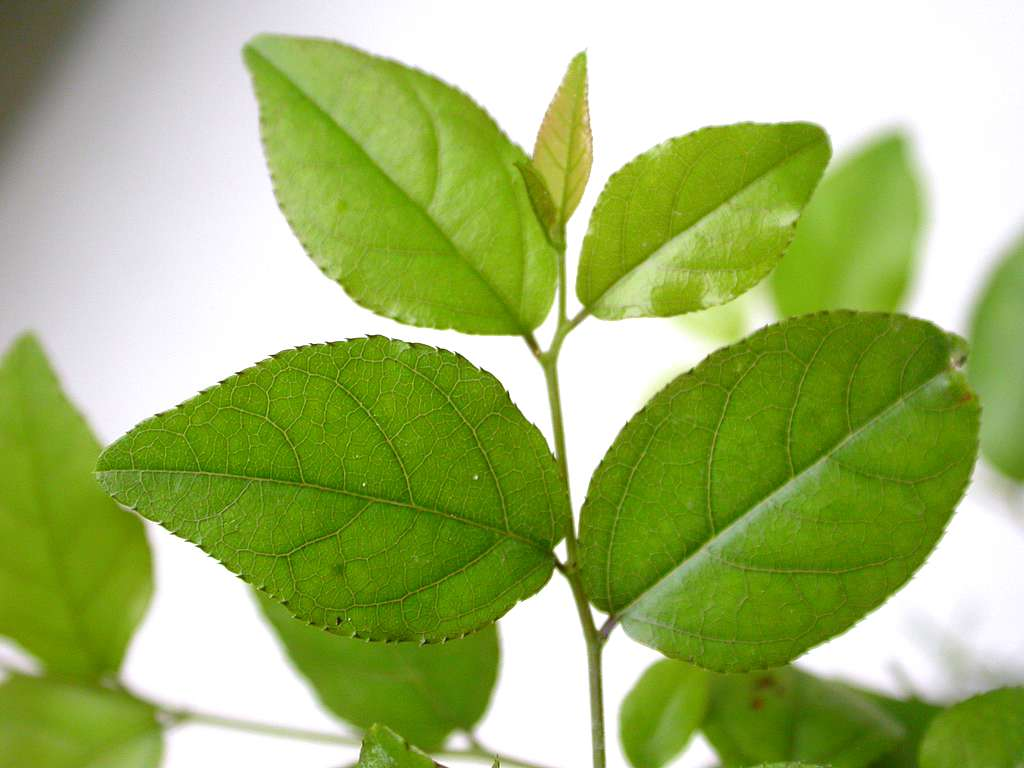

Scientific classification
- Kingdom: Plantae
- Clade: Tracheophytes
- Clade: Angiosperms
- Clade: Eudicots
- Clade: Rosids
- Order: Rosales
- Family: Rhamnaceae
- Genus: Sageretia
- Species: S. thea

Binomial name
- Sageretia thea Brongn.

= Sageretia theezans =

Species of shrub

Sageretia thea or Sageretia theezans (sageretia, mock buckthorn, sweet-plum or Chinese sweet plum) is a shrub from the family Rhamnaceae, native to southern China. It is widely used for creating bonsai.

== Description ==
It grows to 1–3 m tall and has small green leaves 1.5–4 cm long, and a leathery multicoloured trunk. It is evergreen and the flowers are small and inconspicuous; the fruit is a small edible drupe 1 cm diameter.
