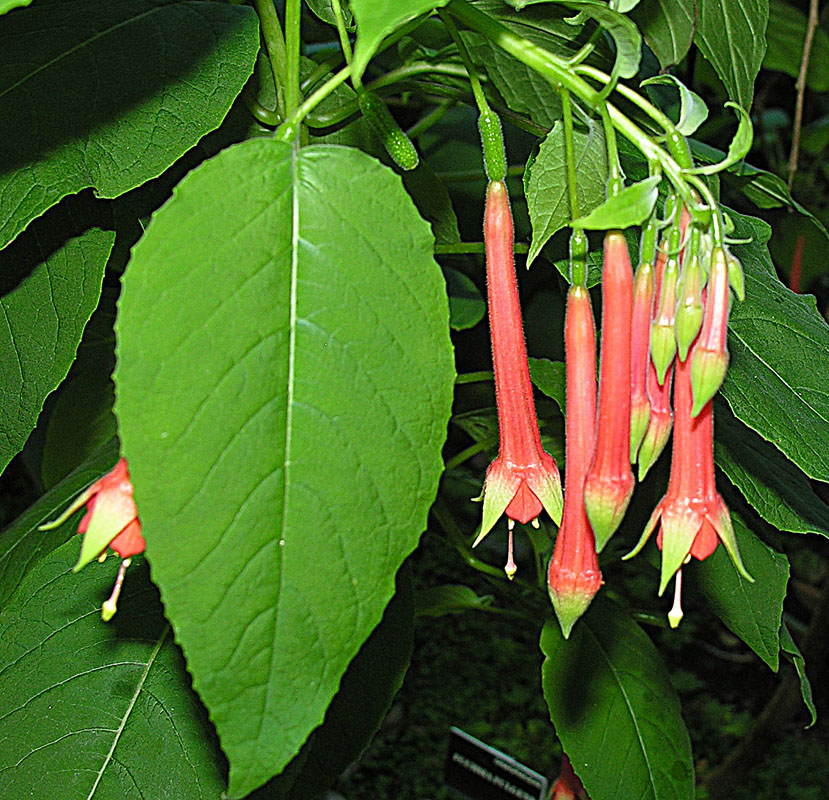

Scientific classification
- Kingdom: Plantae
- Clade: Tracheophytes
- Clade: Angiosperms
- Clade: Eudicots
- Clade: Rosids
- Order: Myrtales
- Family: Onagraceae
- Genus: Fuchsia
- Species: F. fulgens

Binomial name
- Fuchsia fulgens Moc. & Sessé ex DC

Synonyms
- Ellobium fulgens Lilja; Spachia fulgens (Moc. & Sessé ex DC) Lilja

= Fuchsia fulgens =

Species of flowering plant

Fuchsia fulgens is a plant of the genus Fuchsia native to Mexico and Central America.

== Description ==
Shrubby, upright growth and thickened, tuberous roots.

- Height and Spread: Reaches heights of 1.5 m (5 ft) or more. Spreads as wide as 80 cm (32 in).
- Stems: Woody
- Leaves: Opposite, ovate or heart-shaped leaves are pale or sage green, paler green or flushed red beneath. Length ranges from 9–23 cm (3.5–9 in), or typically 17x12cm (7x5in) with fine red teeth tipped with glands.
- Flowers: Short, terminal racemes of pendant, single flowers.
  - Tube: Tubes range in color from pink to dull red or scarlet.
  - Sepals: Sepals are pale red, or pale yellow at the base, and tinged yellow-green at the margins.
  - Corolla: Bright red in color.
- Fruit: Oblong to ellipsoid in shape and deep purple in color.

== Cultivation ==
- Hardiness: Half-hardy. Minimum temperature of 5 °C (41 °F).

== Etymology ==
Fuchsia is named for Leonhart Fuchs (1501–1566), a renaissance botanist and professor at Tübingen. Fulgens means 'shining' or 'glistening', often in reference (as in this case) to red flowers.
