= Fifty-three Stations of the Tōkaidō as Potted Landscapes =

Japanese botanical art

The 53 Stations of the Tōkaidō as Potted Landscapes is a Japanese art book published by print artist Utagawa Yoshishige as two volumes in 1848. Each image is an artist's print, and the source for each image is a single Japanese bowl landscape in the traditional bonkei art form. All individual bonkei specimens were created by a second artist, and those physical bonkei then drawn by Utagawa Yoshishige and processed into colored ink-block prints. The printed images were hand-colored and bound, along with a few pages of prefatory text, then published as a pair of books.

== Influences ==
The original source of the "53 Stations" artistic project is an earlier book of art prints. Famed Japanese woodblock-print (ukiyo-e) artist Utagawa Hiroshige published a successful book of art prints titled The Fifty-three Stations of the Tōkaidō (1833–1834). Each print in his book is a scene, generally an exterior setting, from the Tōkaidō road. This famed traveler's route was the most important of the Five Routes of the Edo period in Japan, running between Kyoto and de-facto capital of Japan at Edo (modern-day Tokyo). The resulting set of prints by Utagawa Hiroshige was popular in Japan and also among European impressionist artists of the 19th century.

== History of the prints ==
More than a decade after publication of the original 53 Stations, a lesser-known woodblock artist, Utagawa Yoshishige, collaborated with a bonkei artist named Kimura Tōsen to create an homage to these prints in his own art book The 53 Stations of the Tōkaidō as Potted Landscapes (1848). For this book, Kimura Tōsen created physical bonkei specimens in bowls, showing the same stations of the Tōkaidō as appeared in Utagawa Hiroshige's famous prints. Utagawa Yoshishige then took the completed bonkei as source material to draw and color 56 prints depicting each of the bonkei specimens. These prints of bonkei closely parallel the popular Tōkaidō prints, to the extent that one can see in the bonkei drawings some of the same human characters, dressed and occupied as they are in Utagawa Hiroshige's original prints. The creative process is described in pages of text appearing in the two volumes.

=== Construction of the depicted bonkei ===
Using a bowl to contain the bonkei specimen is not common in modern bonkei, which favors an inconspicuous low-sided container to showcase the bonkei materials and resulting scene. The construction details of the physical bonkei used to inspire the print artist Utagawa Yoshishige have not been preserved, nor have the bonkei themselves. Inspection of the prints suggests that the materials used, apart from the bowl-shaped containers, were similar to those in modern Japanese bonkei, including:

- sculptable materials for "ground" areas and for three-dimensional terrain features, such as pools, riverbeds, and mountains,
- sculpted elements painted to resemble the natural environment,
- flat areas representing plains or open water, covered with colored sand or gravel, and
- real rocks, optionally embedded in the landscape.

Bonkei displays may also have a backdrop screen, portraying, for example, specific landscape elements or an abstract skyscape. These backgrounds do not appear frequently in the "Fifty-three Stations of the Tōkaidō as Potted Landscapes", but the background image of Mount Fuji in volume 1, page 7 (the start of the route, identified as print A-01 in the galleries below) does not appear to be part of the bonkei itself, and a similar image appears in at least one later print (print A-14 in volume 1, which parallel the prints titled 'Mount Fuji in the Morning' from the original "Fifty-three Stations of the Tōkaidō" print series, as seen in the Metropolitan Museum collection ).

== Contents of 53 Stations of the Tōkaidō as Potted Landscapes ==
The following two sections contain photographic reproductions of all contents, including text and block prints of bonkei, in Book 1 and Book 2 of the "53 Stations of the Tōkaidō as Potted Landscapes". (Courtesy of Special Collections, USDA National Agricultural Library.)

=== Volume I ===
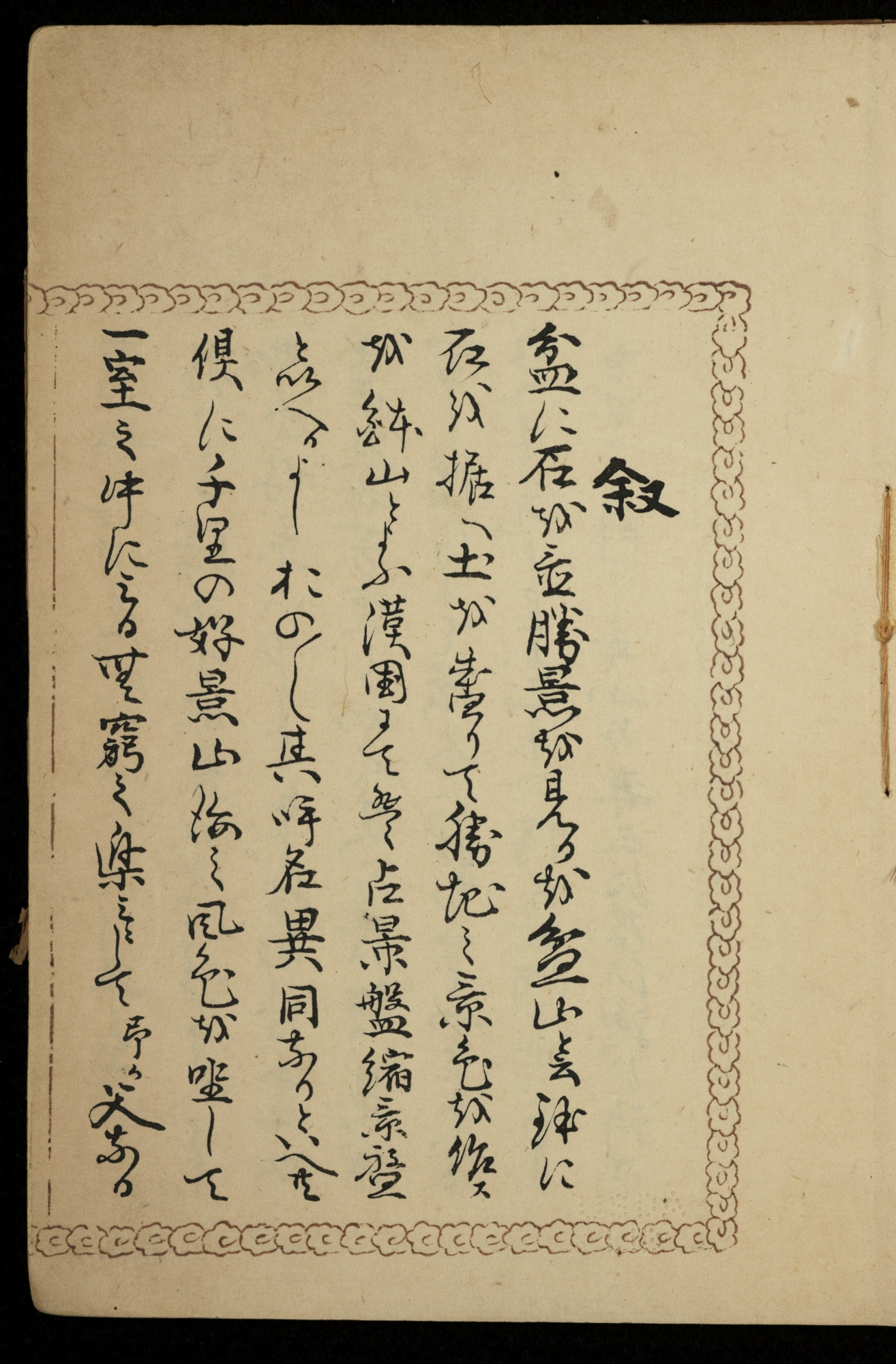
Color print depicting preface, page 01

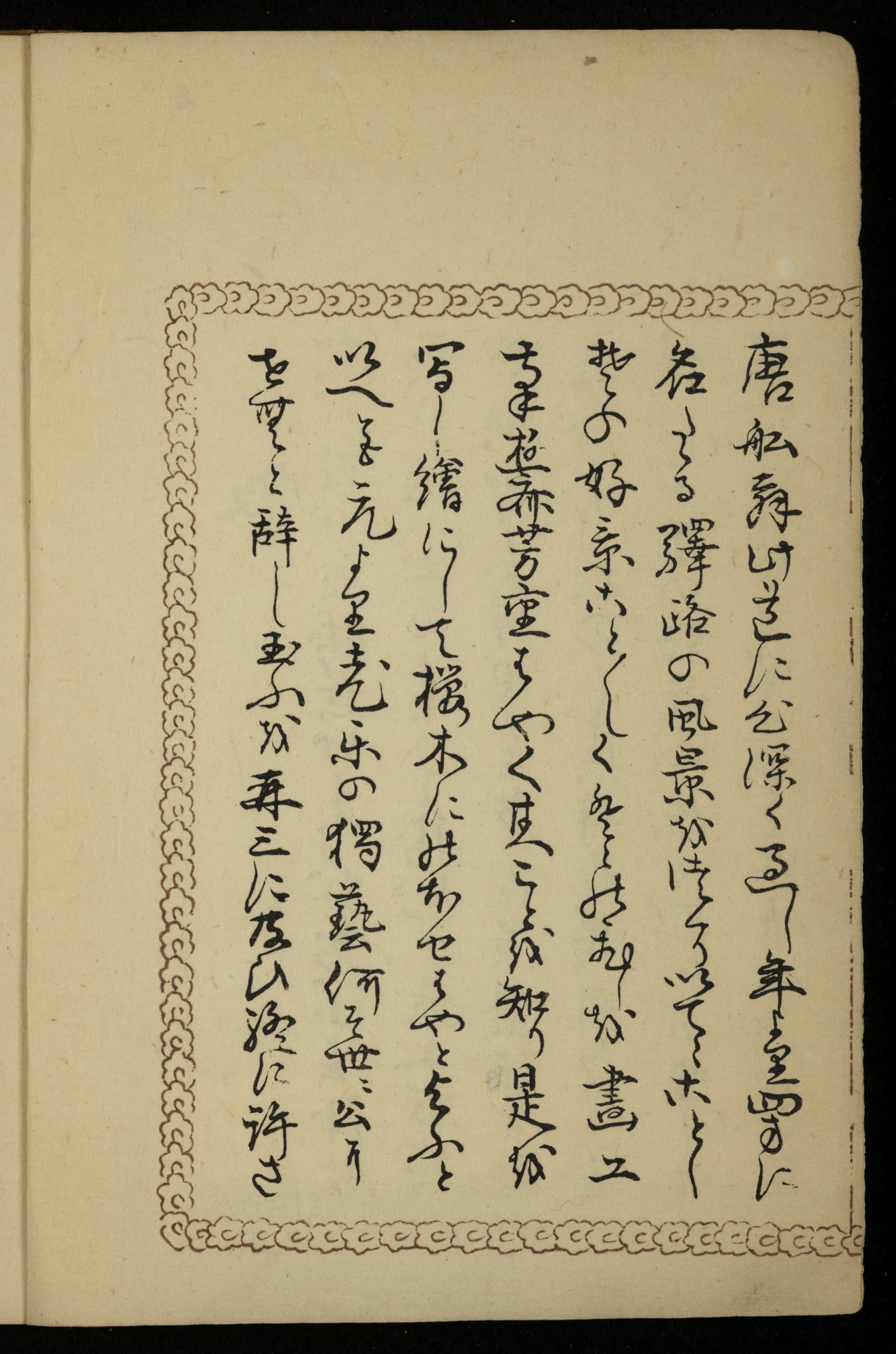
Color print depicting preface, page 02

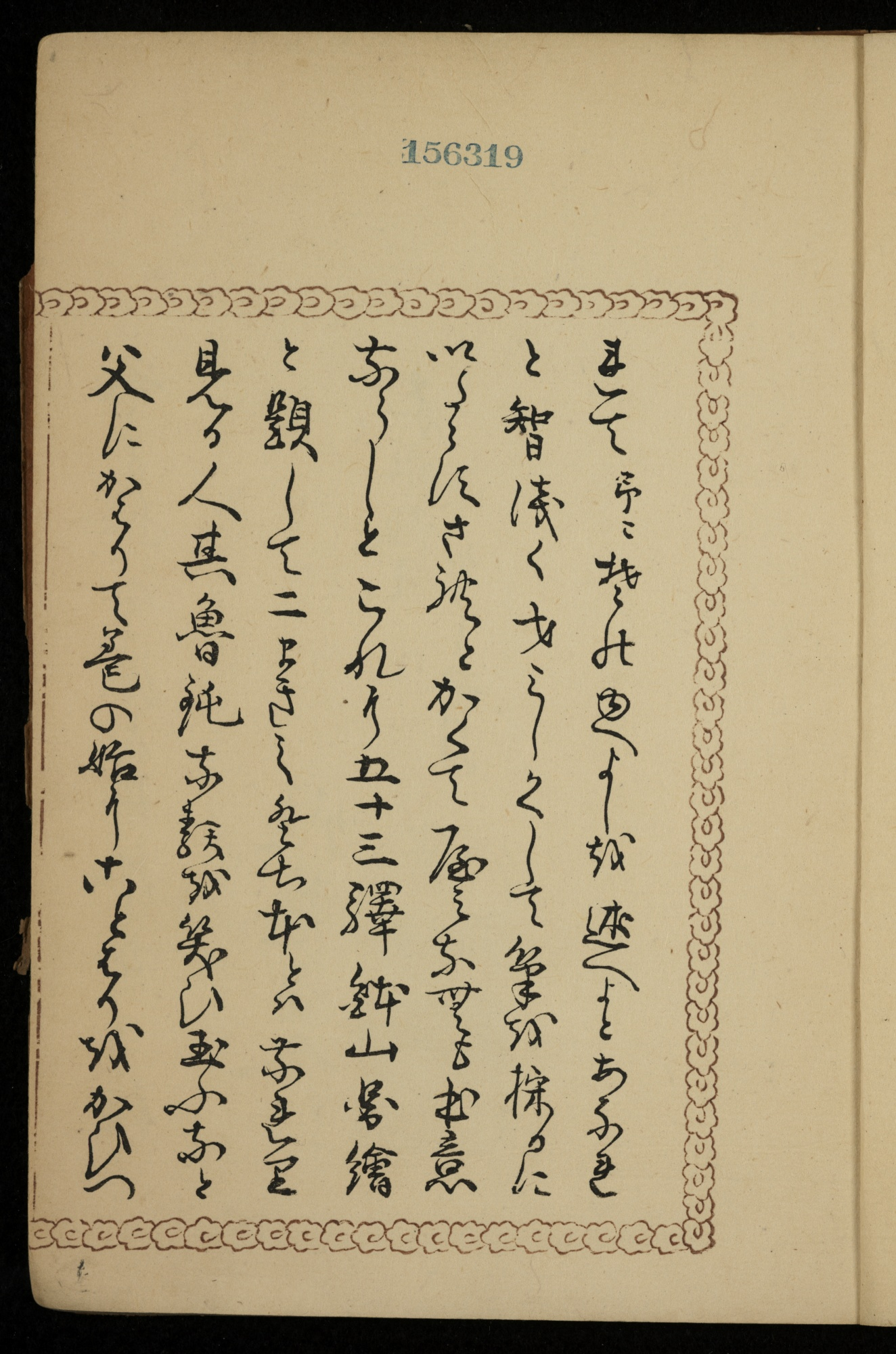
Color print depicting preface, page 03

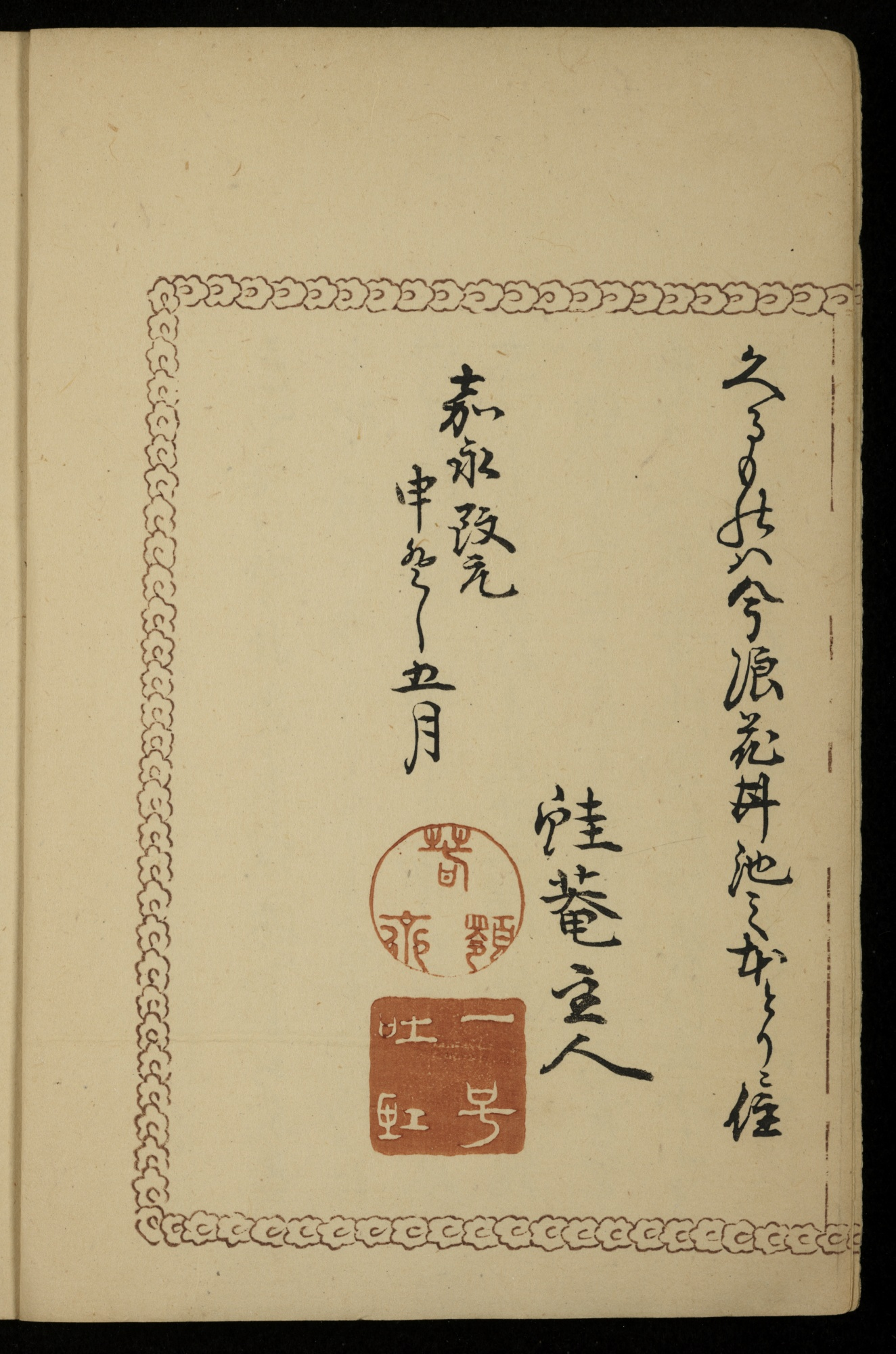
Color print depicting preface, page 04

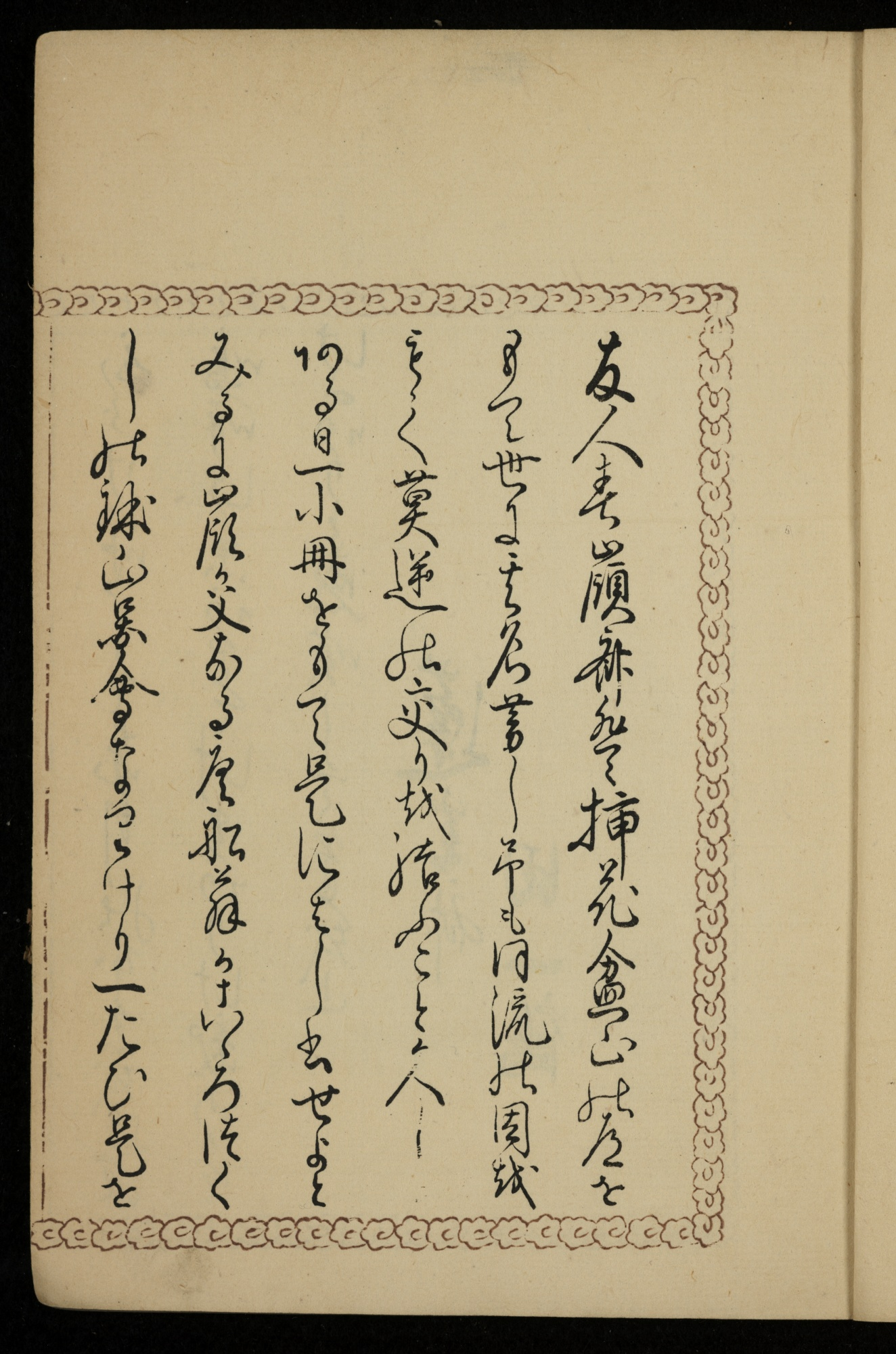
Color print depicting preface, page 05

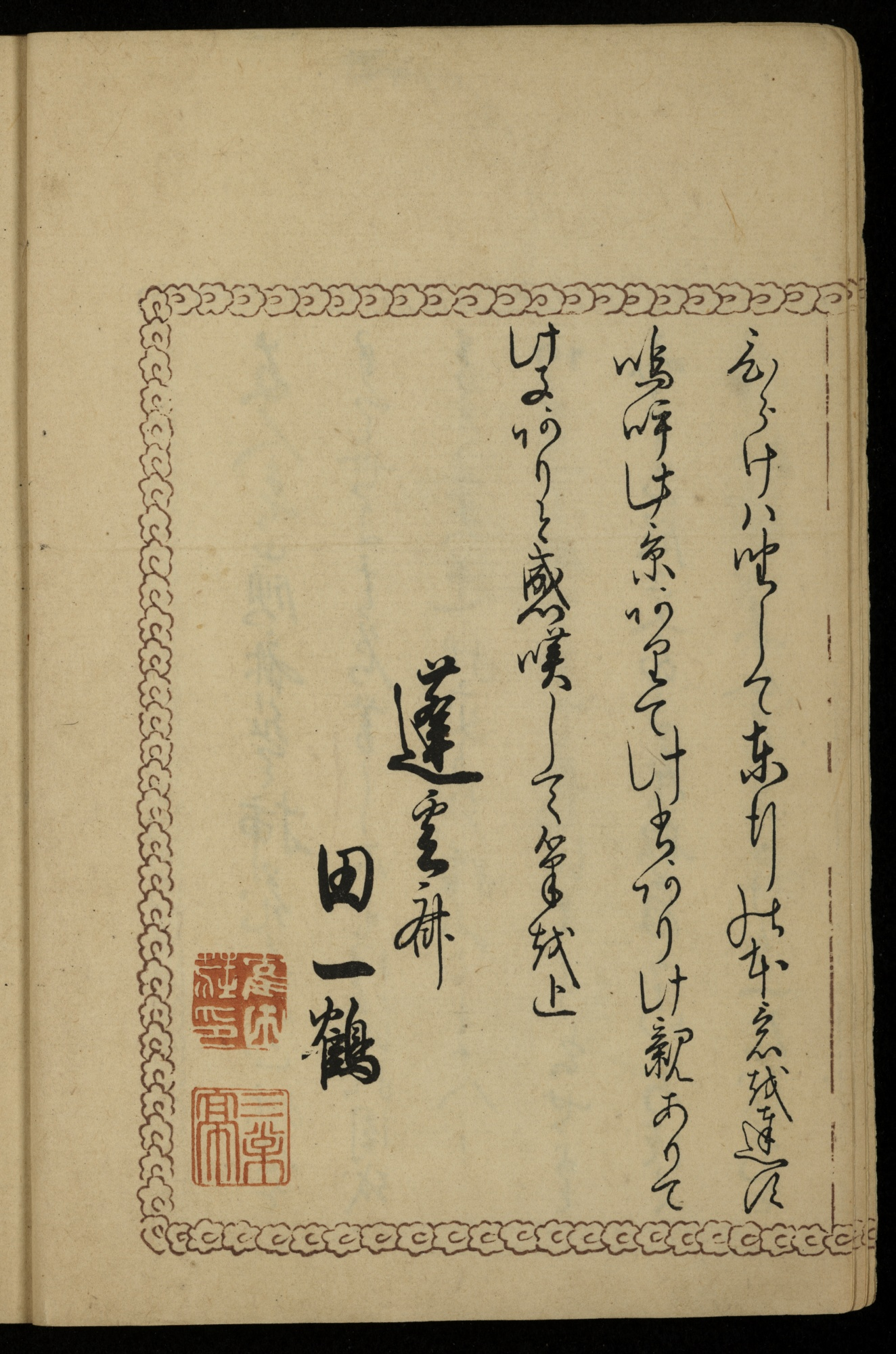
Color print depicting preface, page 06

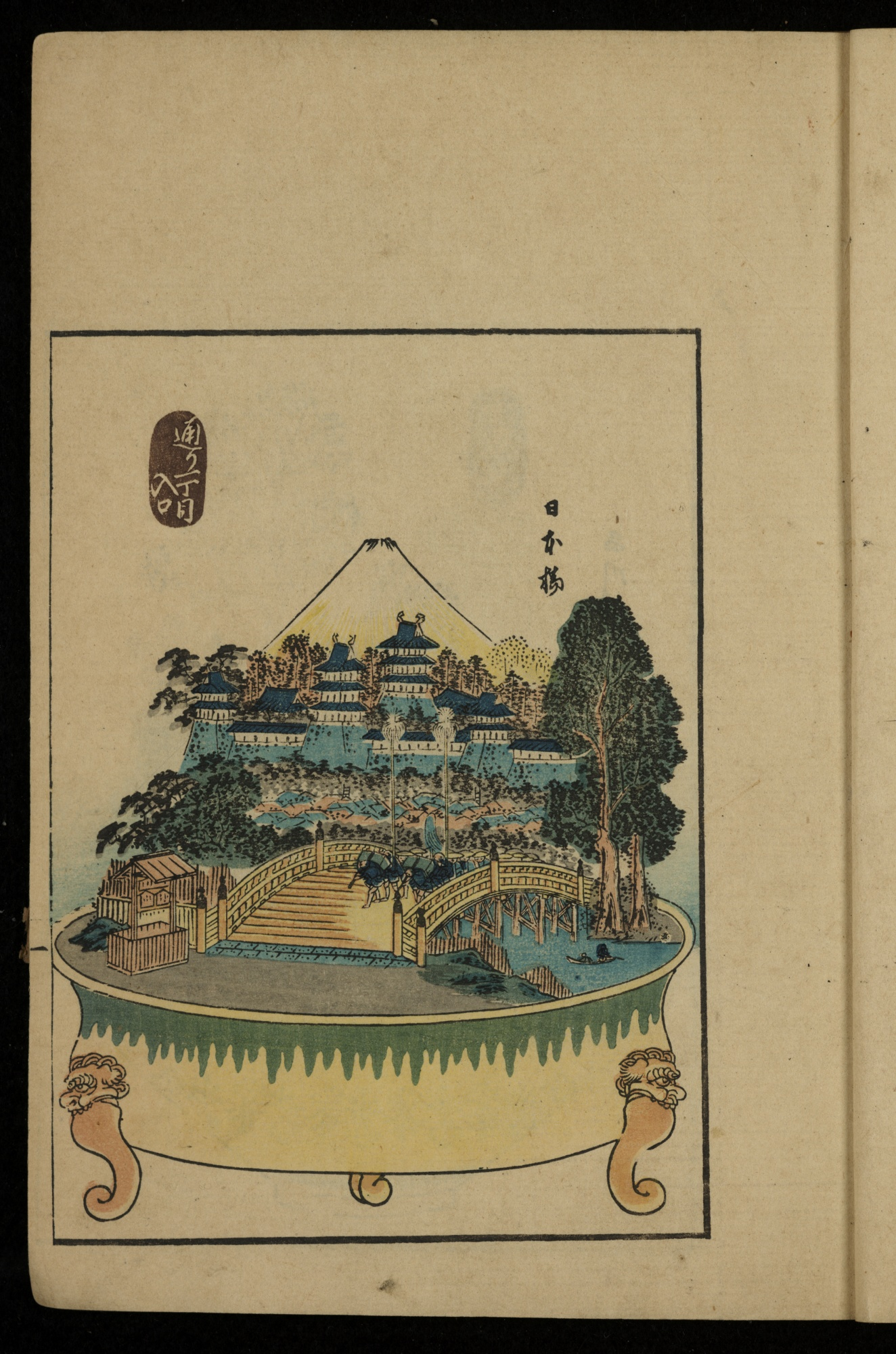
Color print depicting a bonkei modeled after The Fifty-three Stations of the Tōkaidō, print A-01

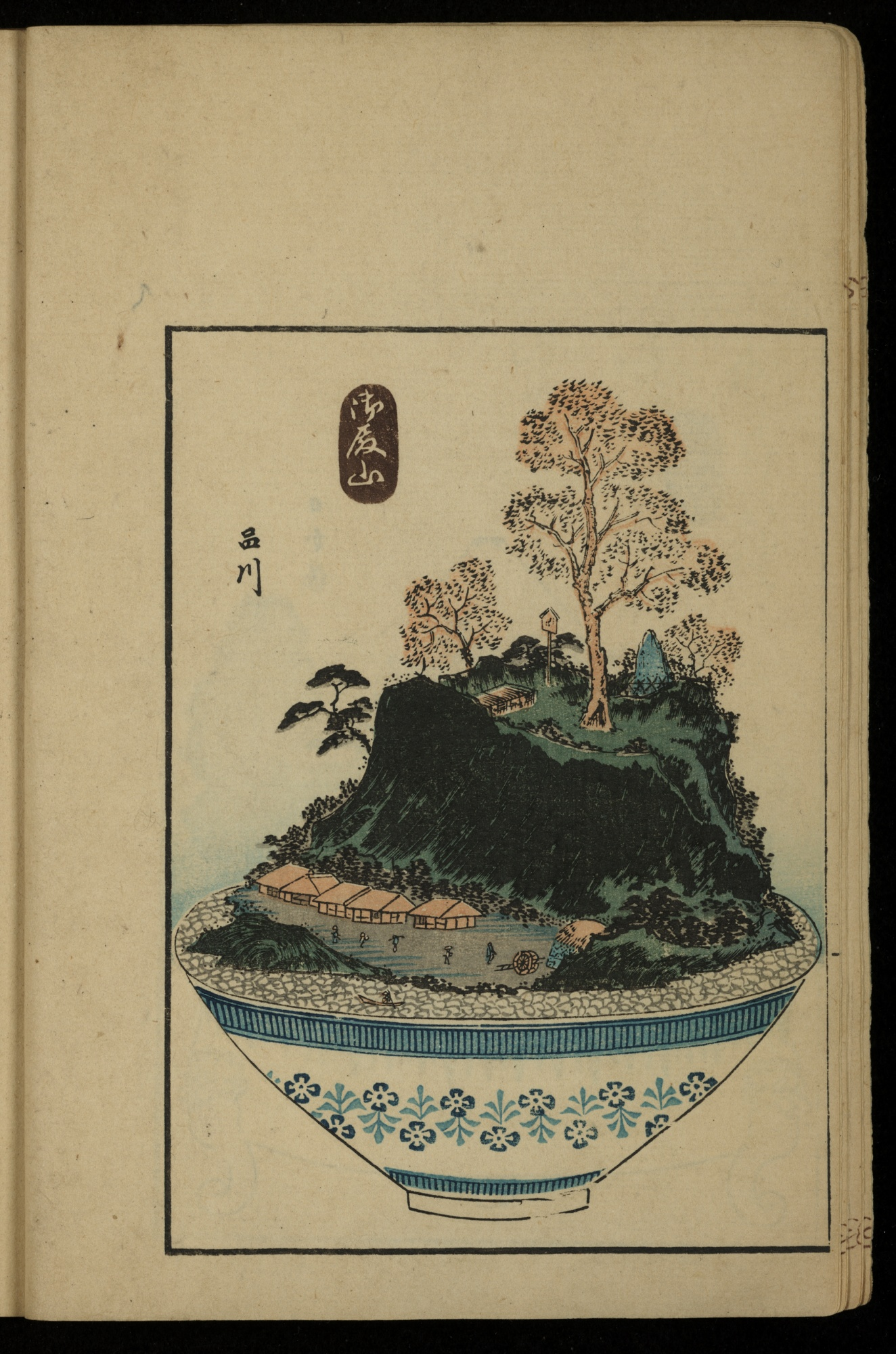
Color print depicting a bonkei modeled after The Fifty-three Stations of the Tōkaidō, print A-02

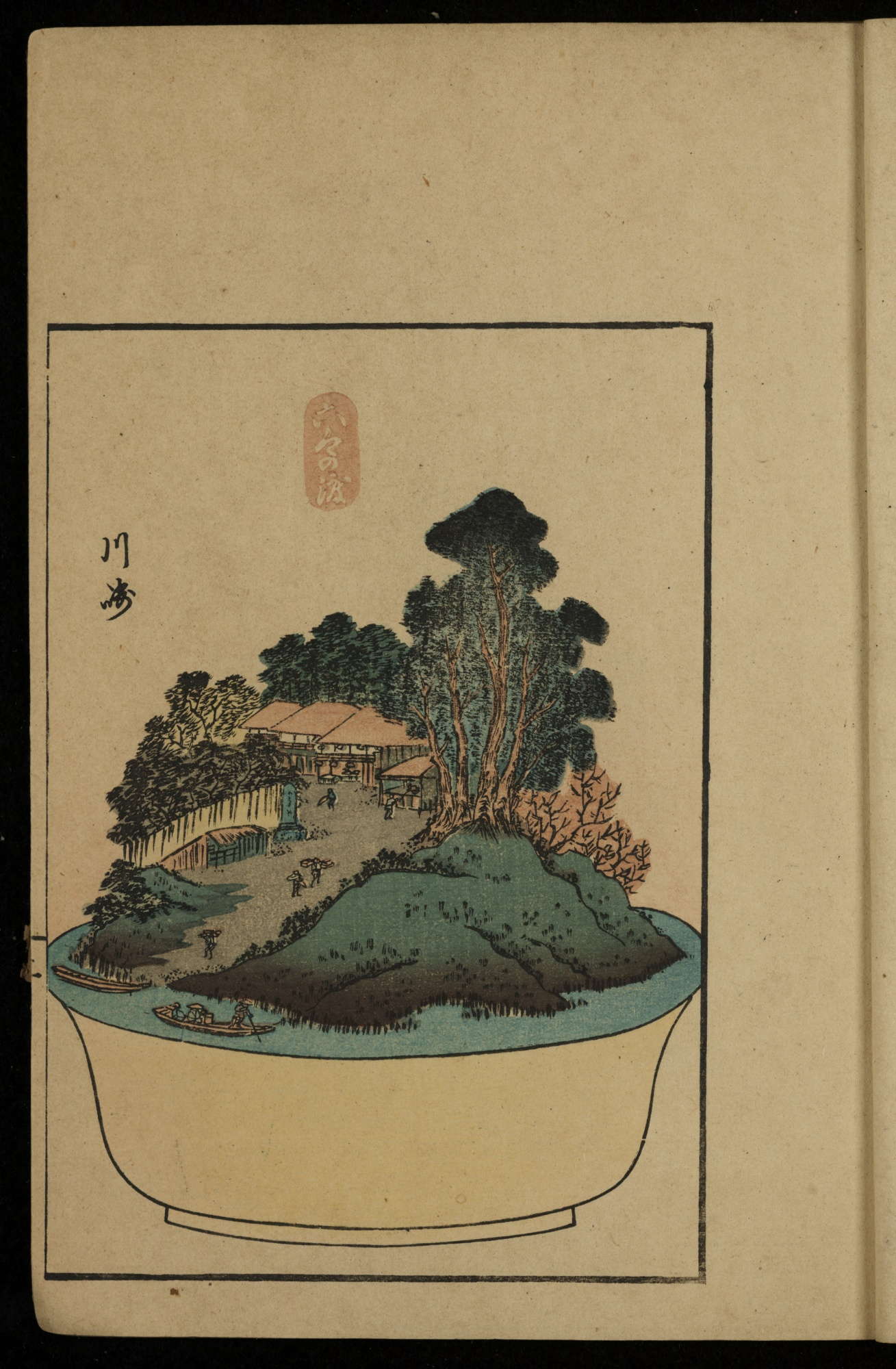
Color print depicting a bonkei modeled after The Fifty-three Stations of the Tōkaidō, print A-03

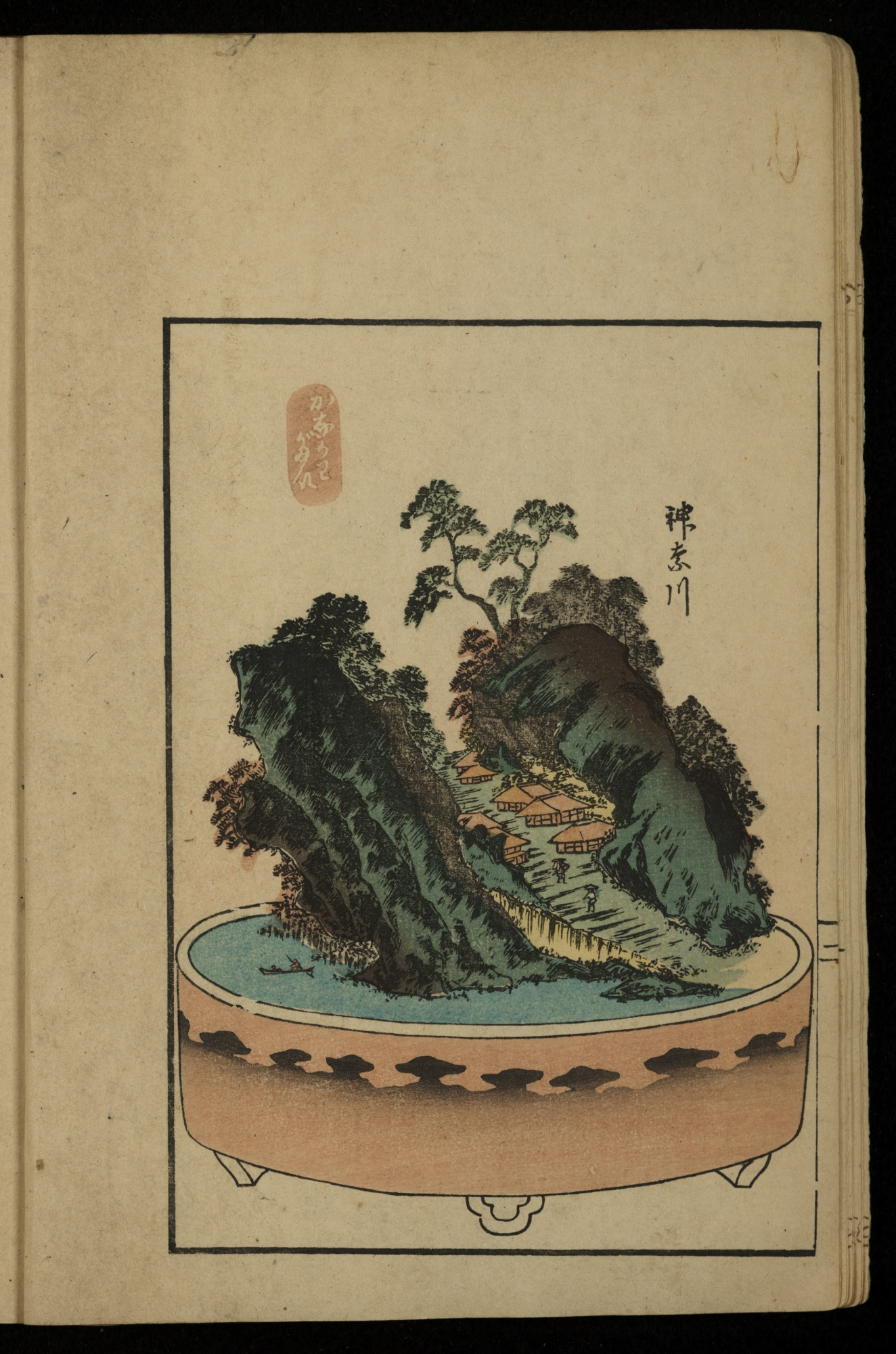
Color print depicting a bonkei modeled after The Fifty-three Stations of the Tōkaidō, print A-04

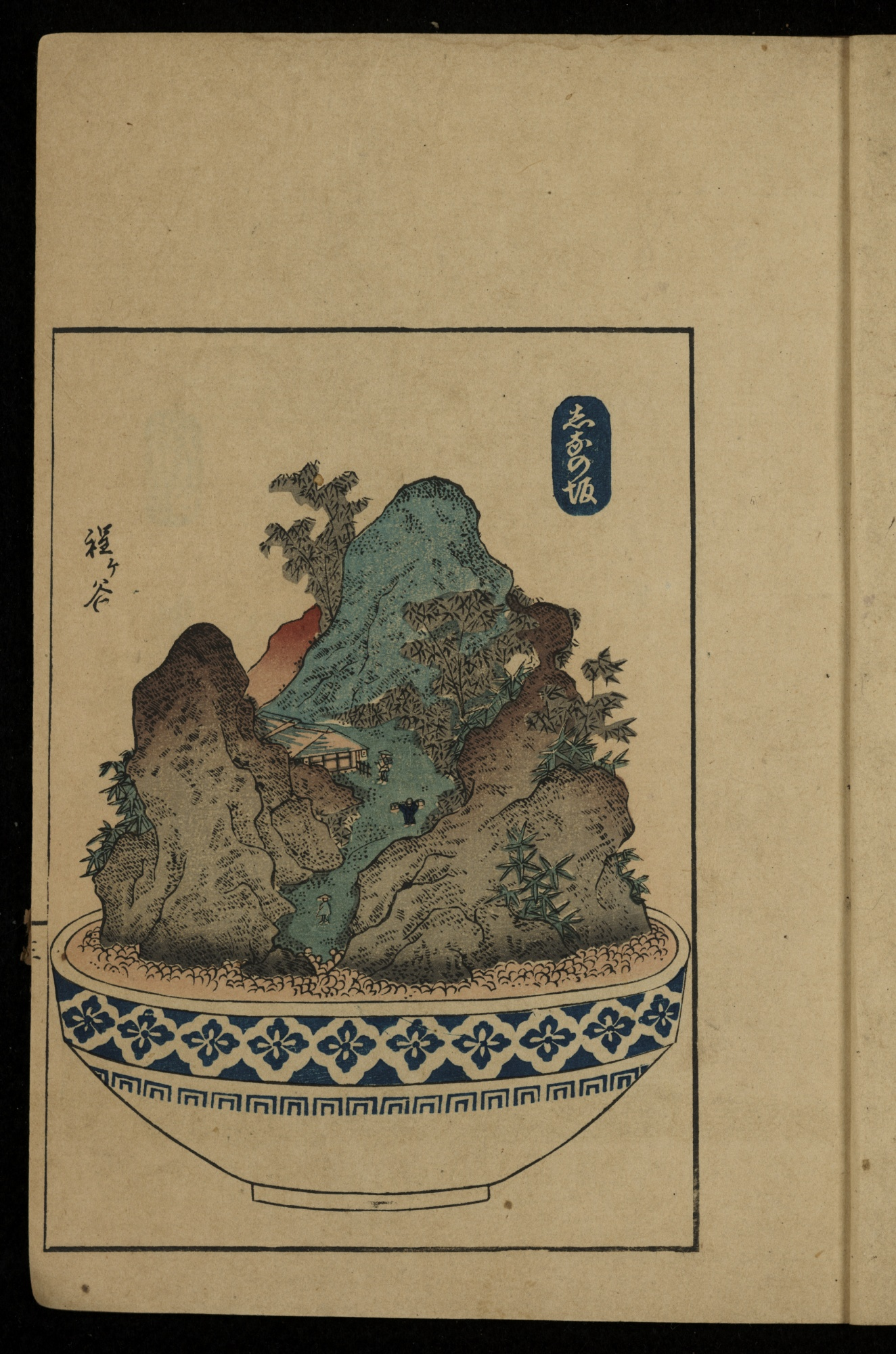
Color print depicting a bonkei modeled after The Fifty-three Stations of the Tōkaidō, print A-05

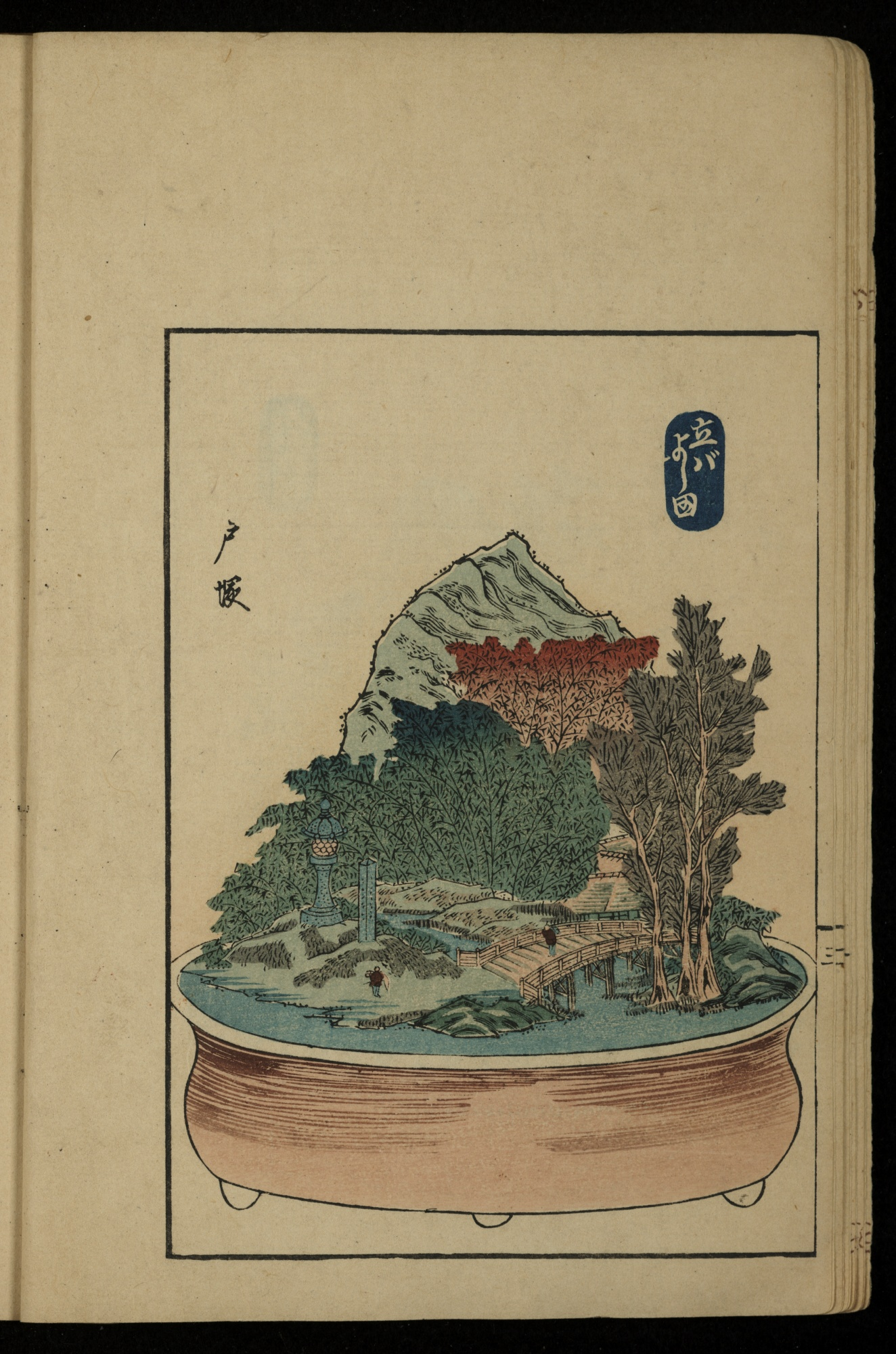
Color print depicting a bonkei modeled after The Fifty-three Stations of the Tōkaidō, print A-06

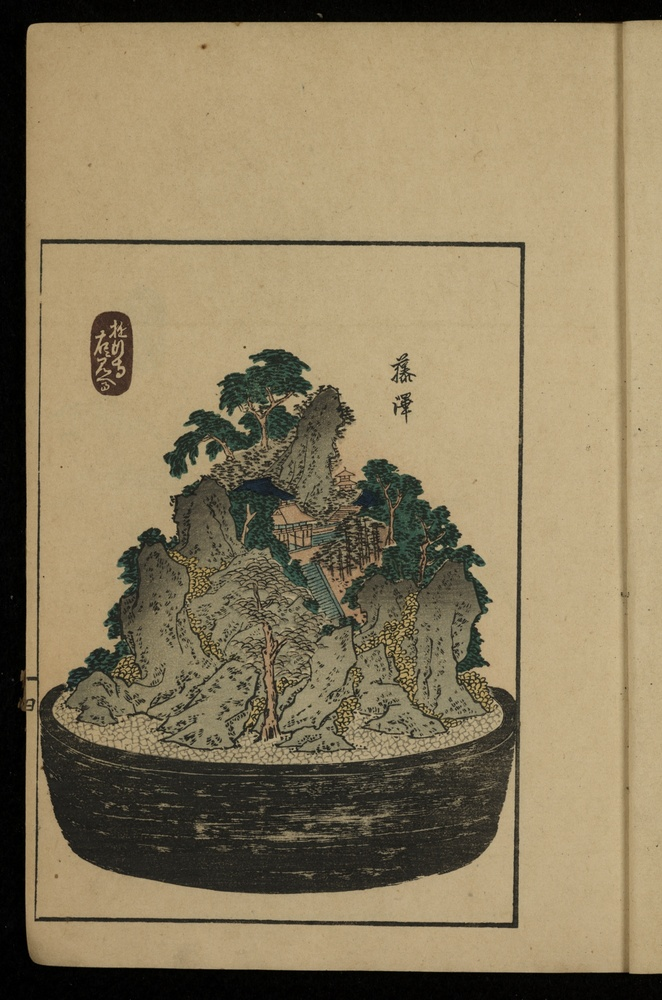
Color print depicting a bonkei modeled after The Fifty-three Stations of the Tōkaidō, print A-07

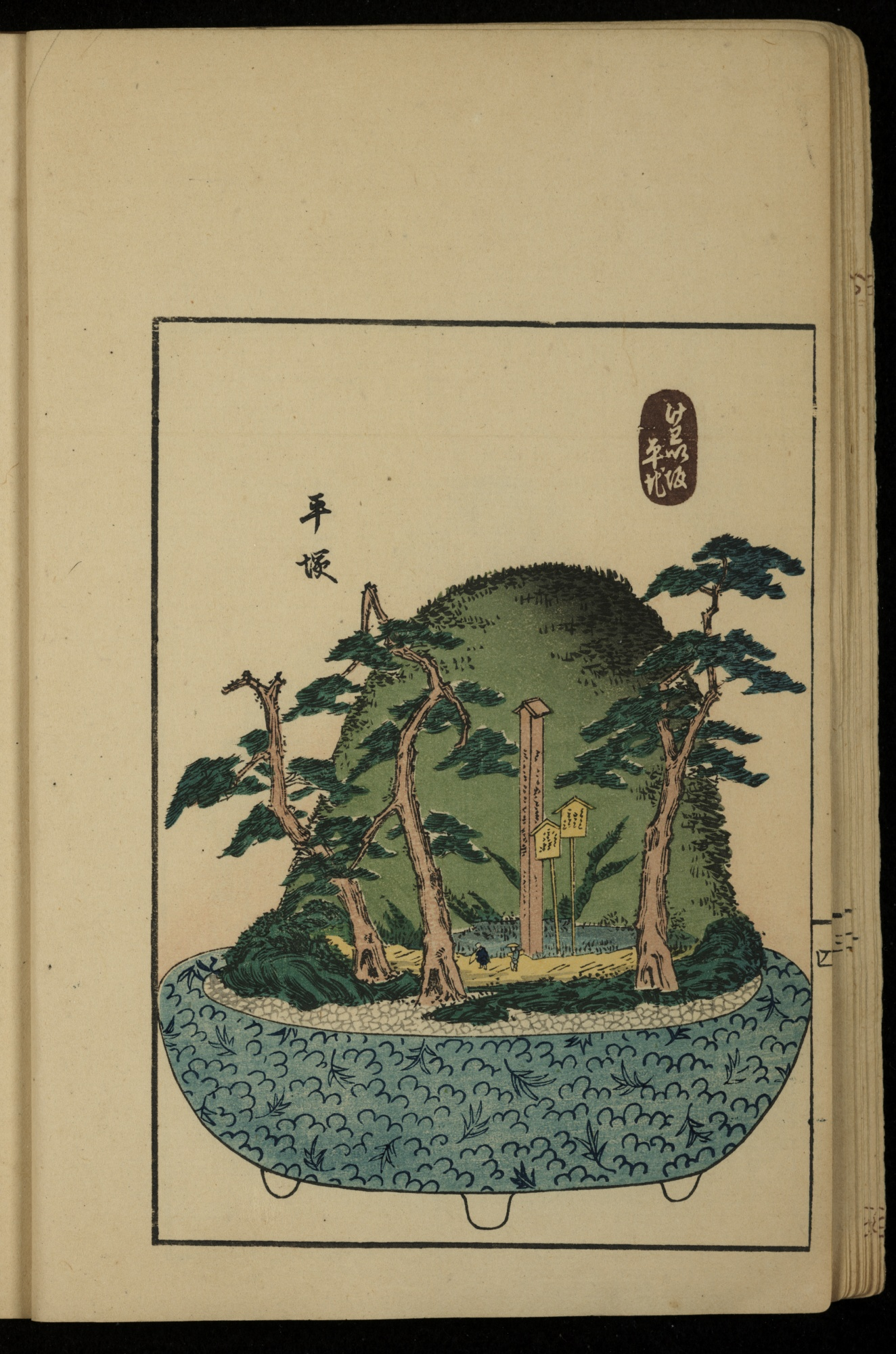
Color print depicting a bonkei modeled after The Fifty-three Stations of the Tōkaidō, print A-08

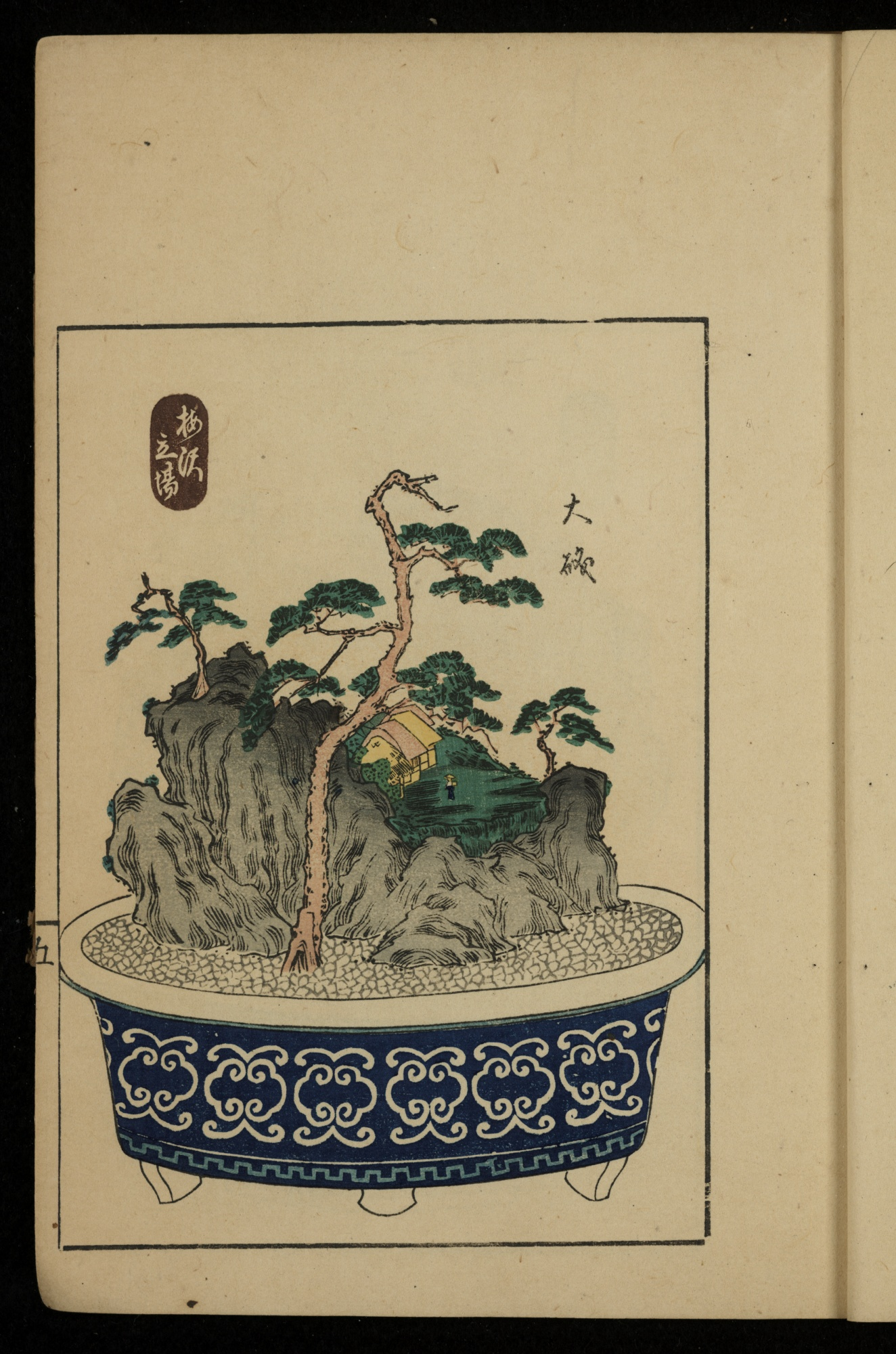
Color print depicting a bonkei modeled after The Fifty-three Stations of the Tōkaidō, print A-09

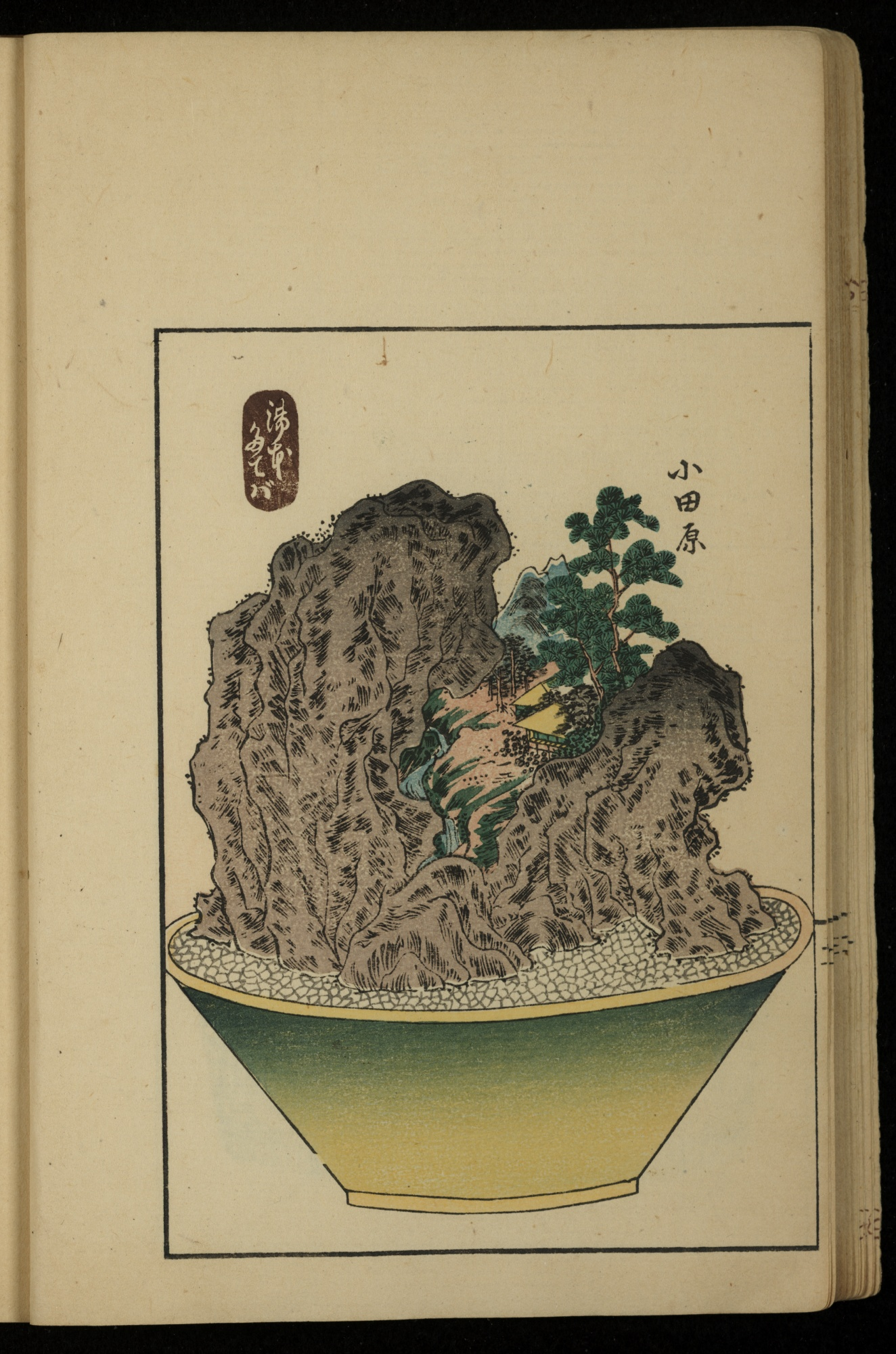
Color print depicting a bonkei modeled after The Fifty-three Stations of the Tōkaidō, print A-10

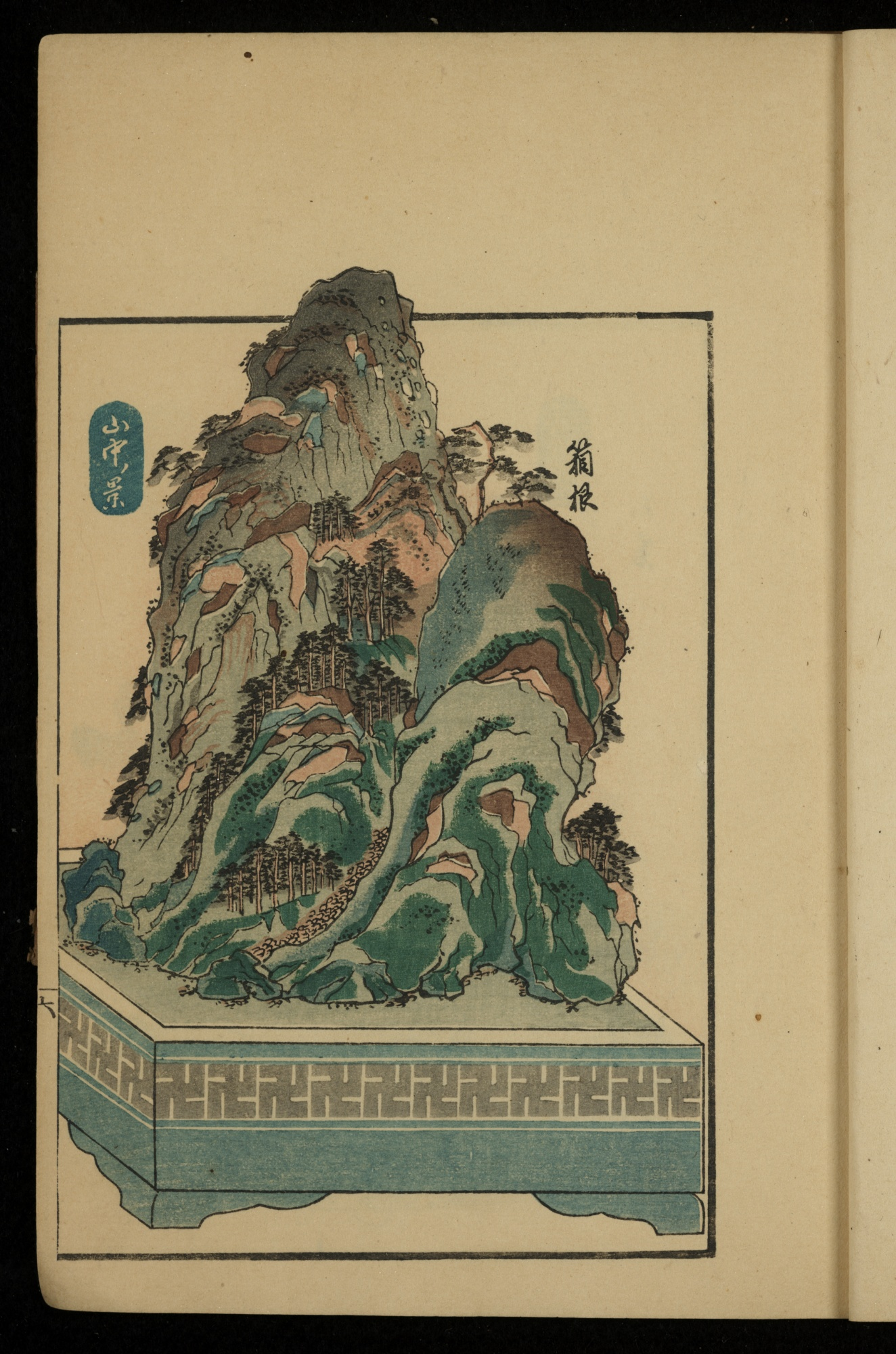
Color print depicting a bonkei modeled after The Fifty-three Stations of the Tōkaidō, print A-11

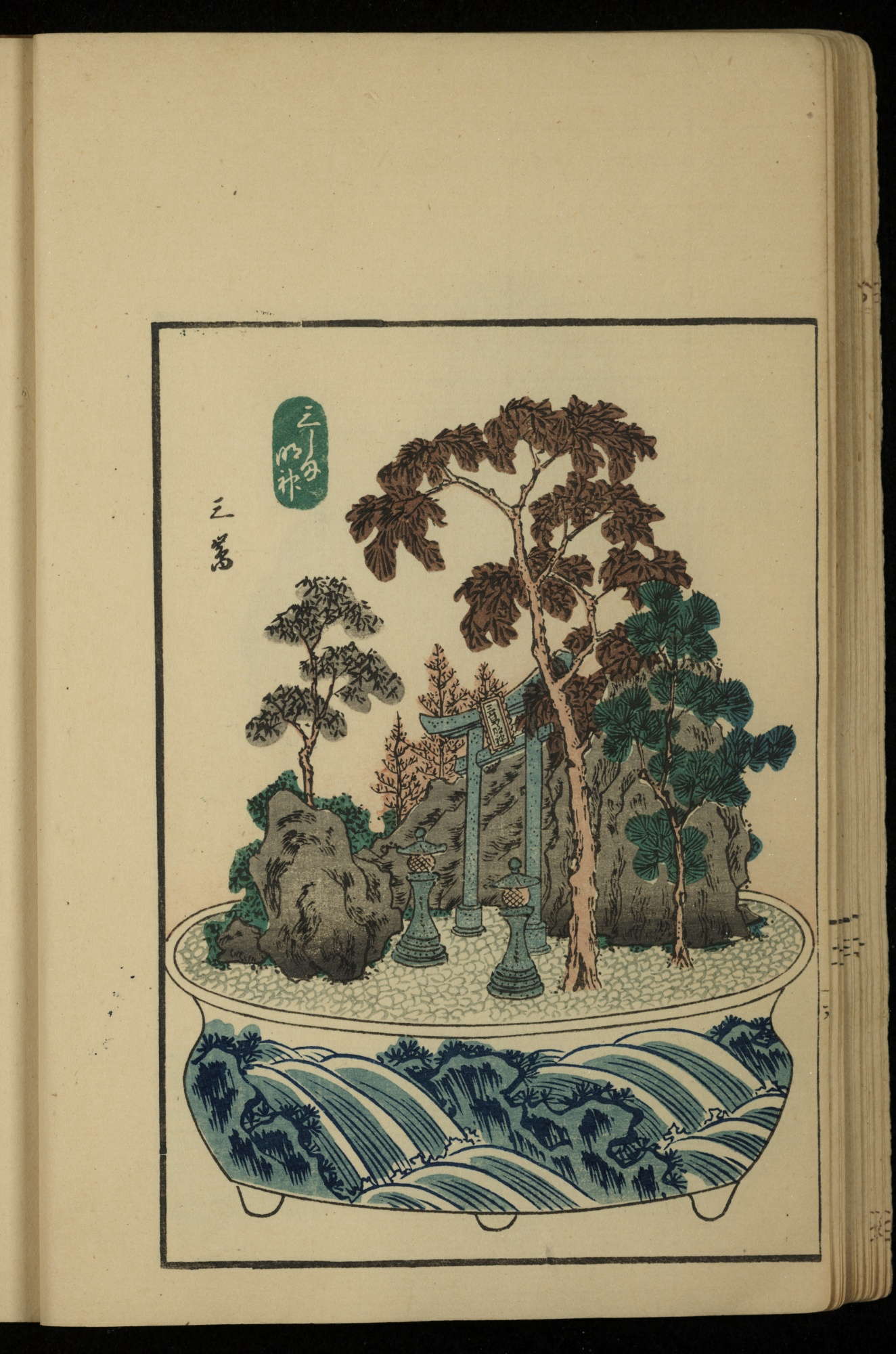
Color print depicting a bonkei modeled after The Fifty-three Stations of the Tōkaidō, print A-12

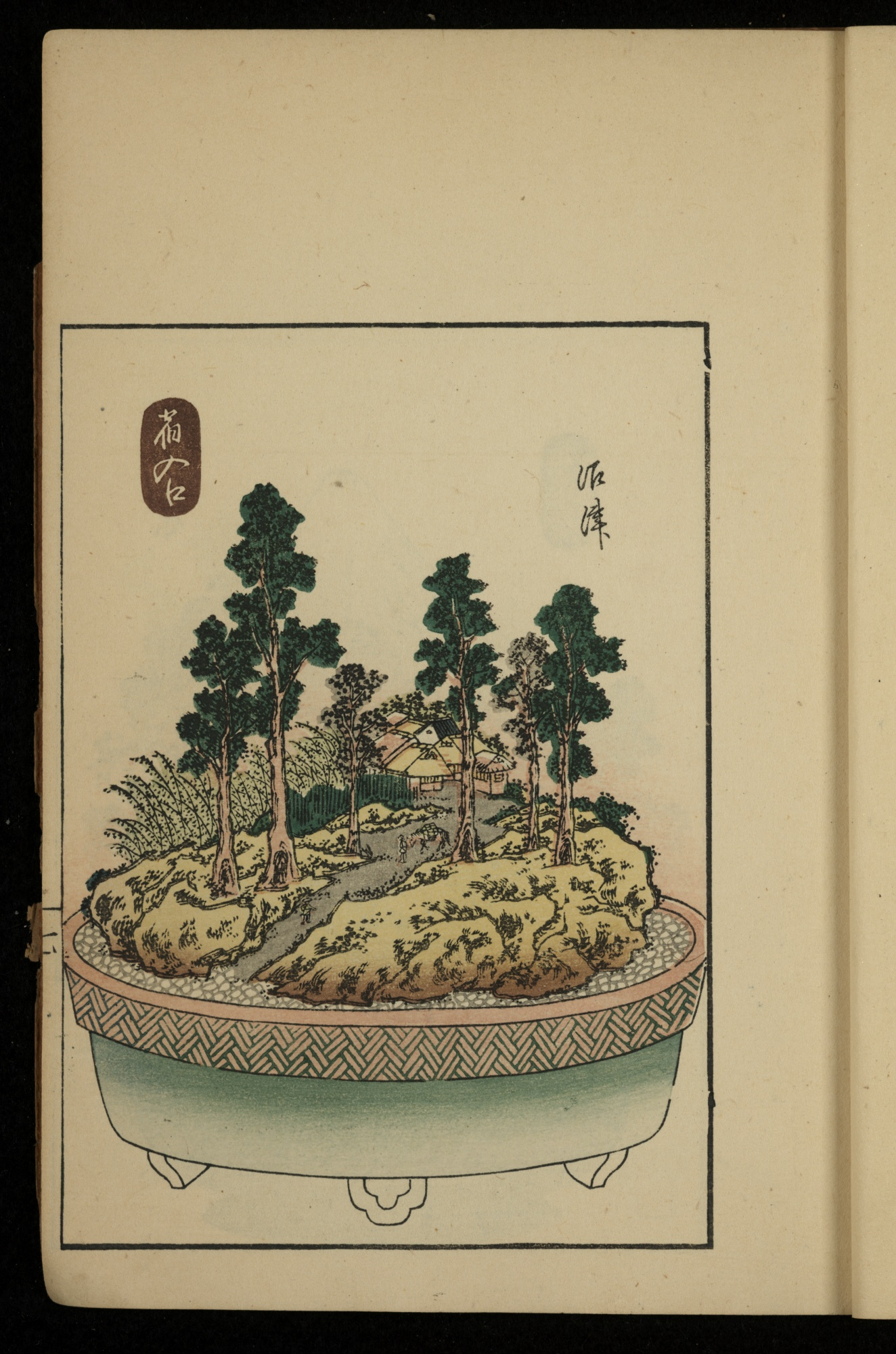
Color print depicting a bonkei modeled after The Fifty-three Stations of the Tōkaidō, print A-13

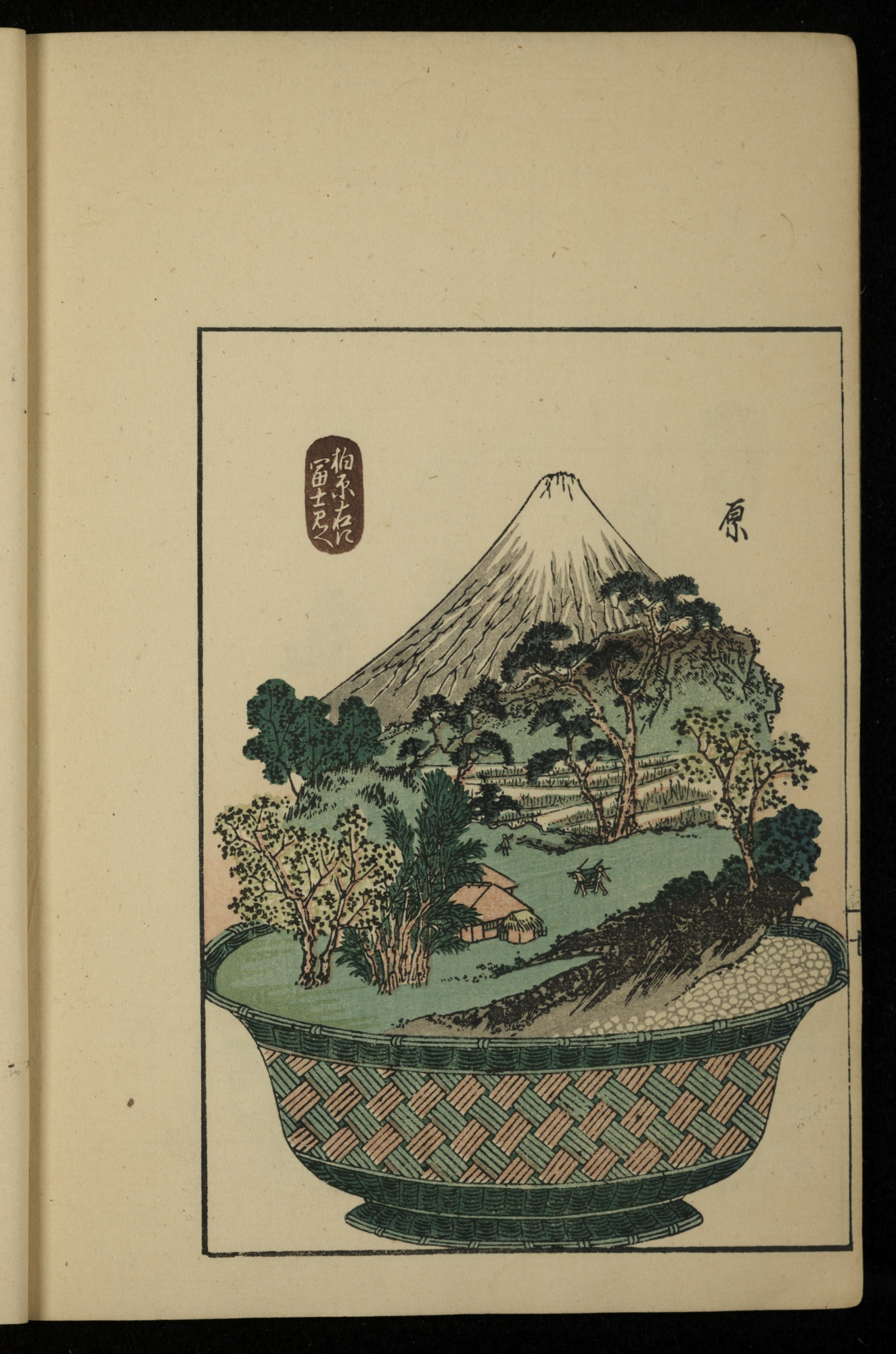
Color print depicting a bonkei modeled after The Fifty-three Stations of the Tōkaidō, print A-14

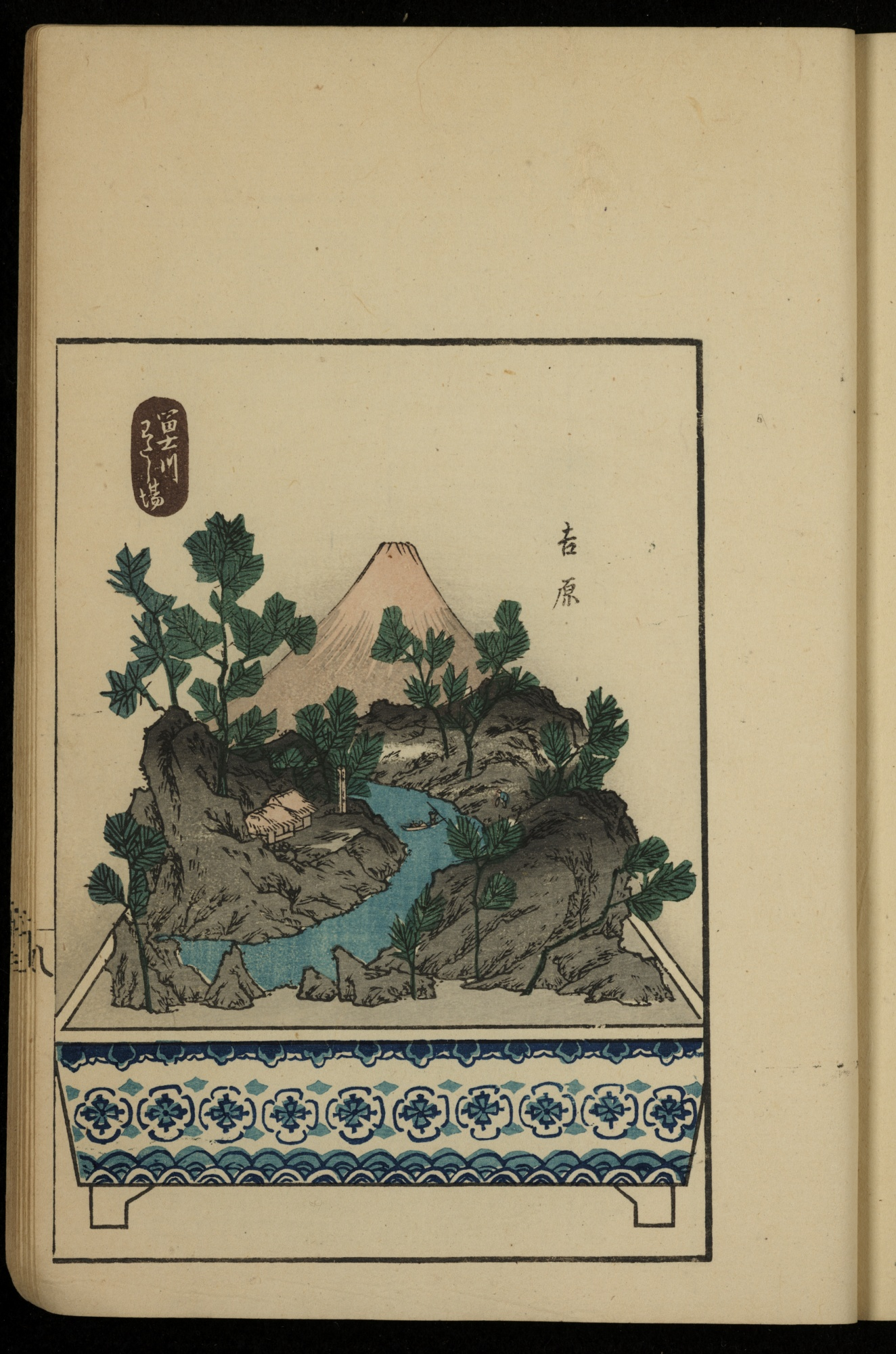
Color print depicting a bonkei modeled after The Fifty-three Stations of the Tōkaidō, print A-15

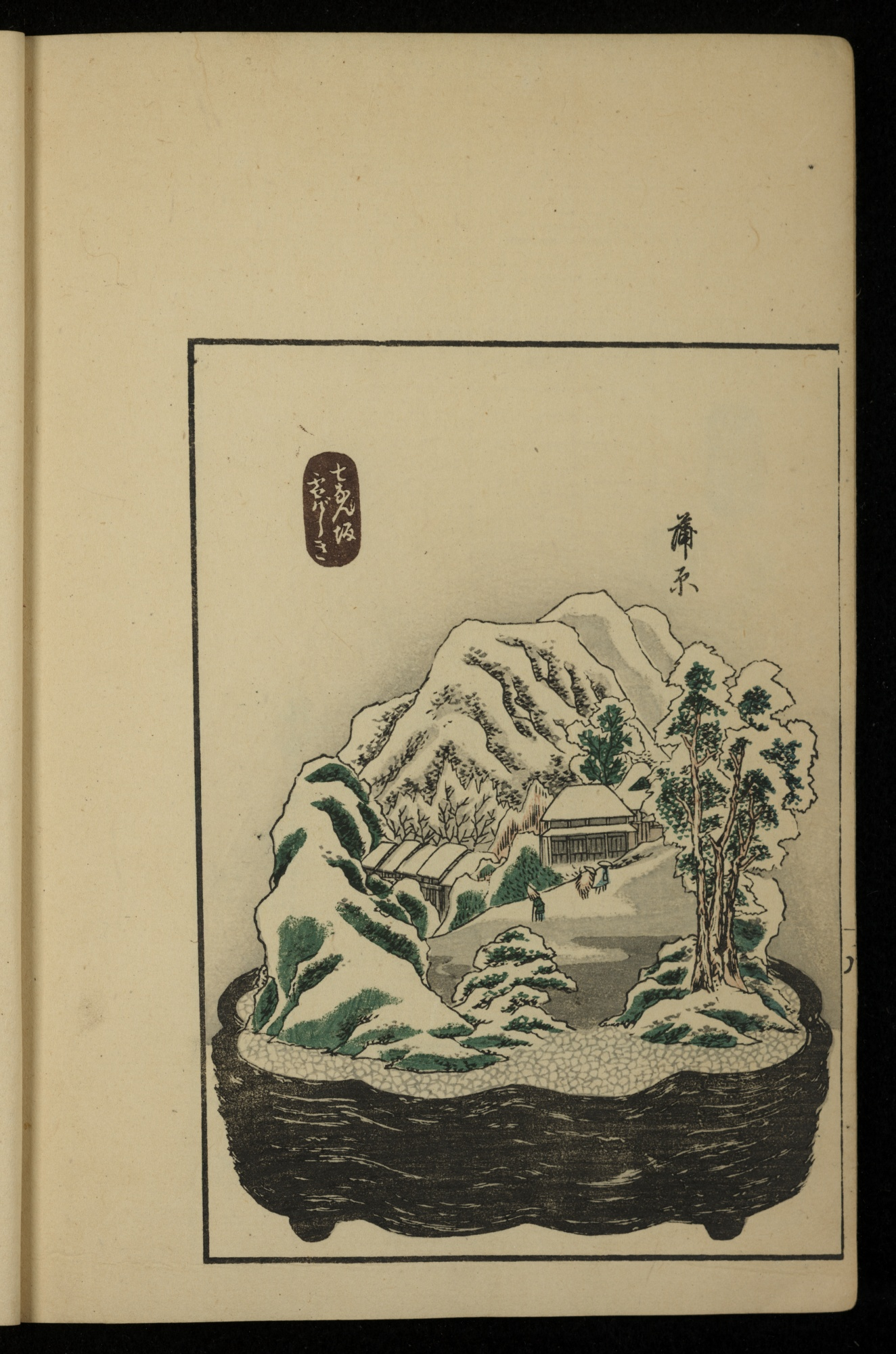
Color print depicting a bonkei modeled after The Fifty-three Stations of the Tōkaidō, print A-16

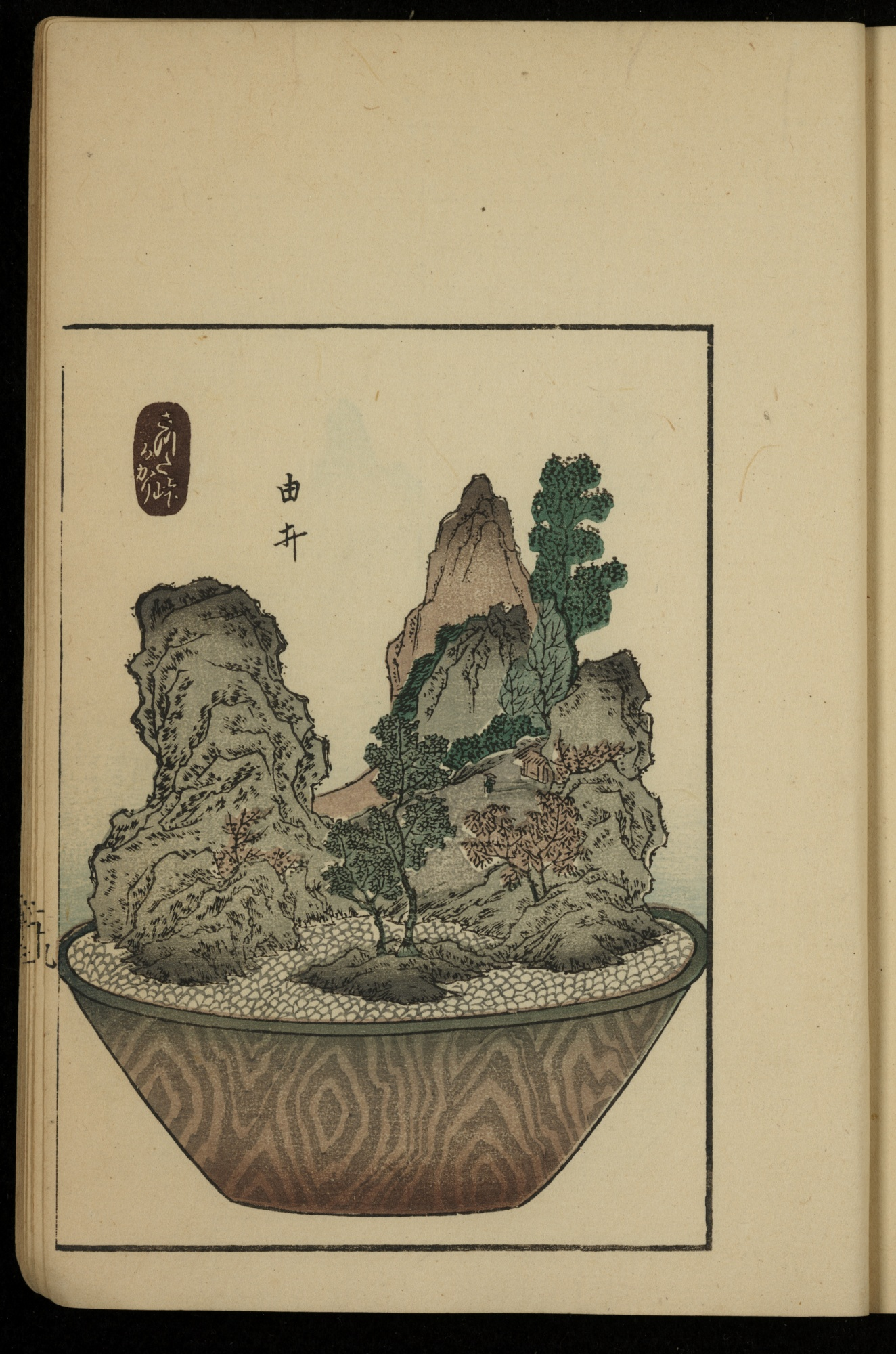
Color print depicting a bonkei modeled after The Fifty-three Stations of the Tōkaidō, print A-17

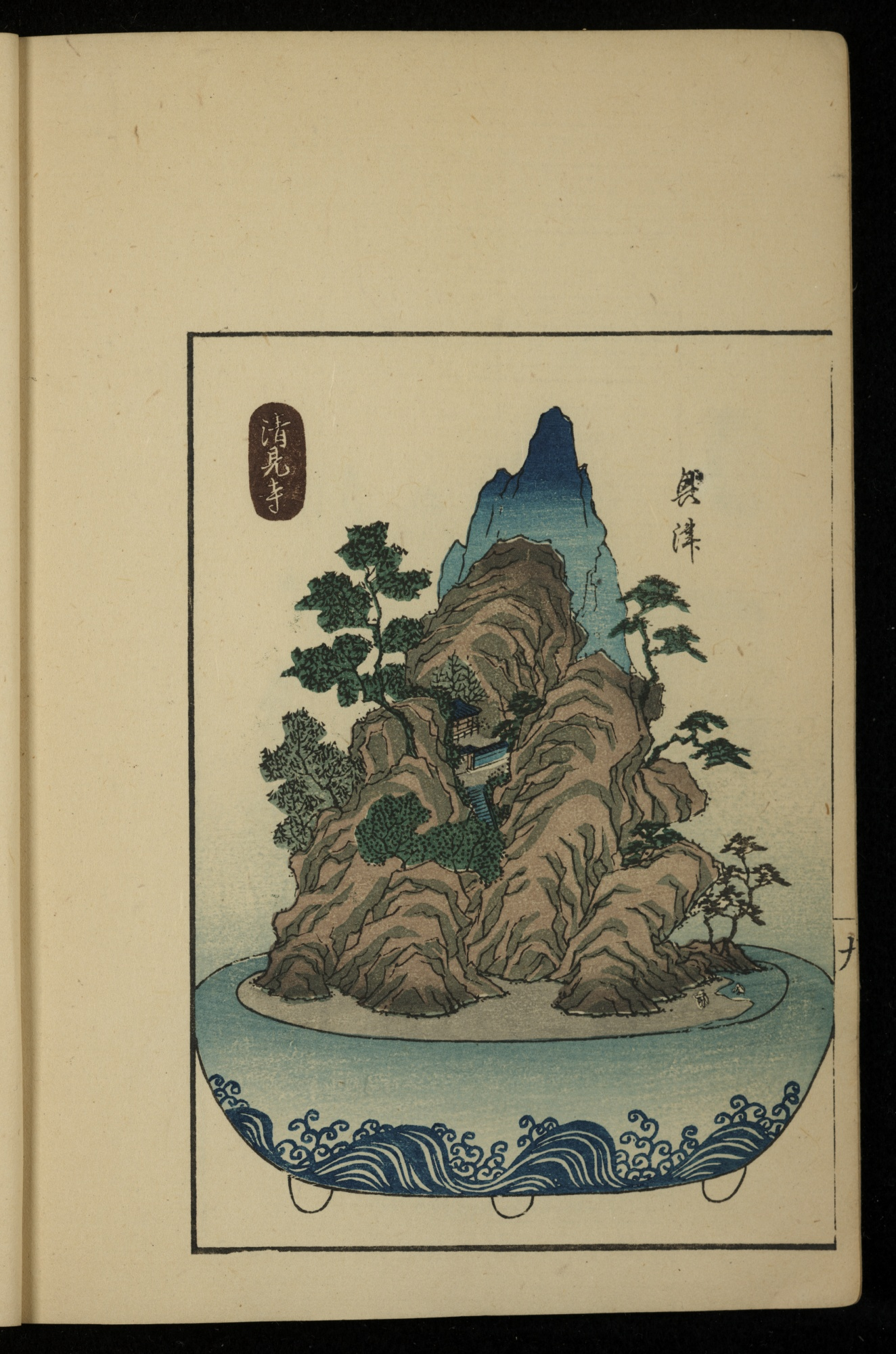
Color print depicting a bonkei modeled after The Fifty-three Stations of the Tōkaidō, print A-18

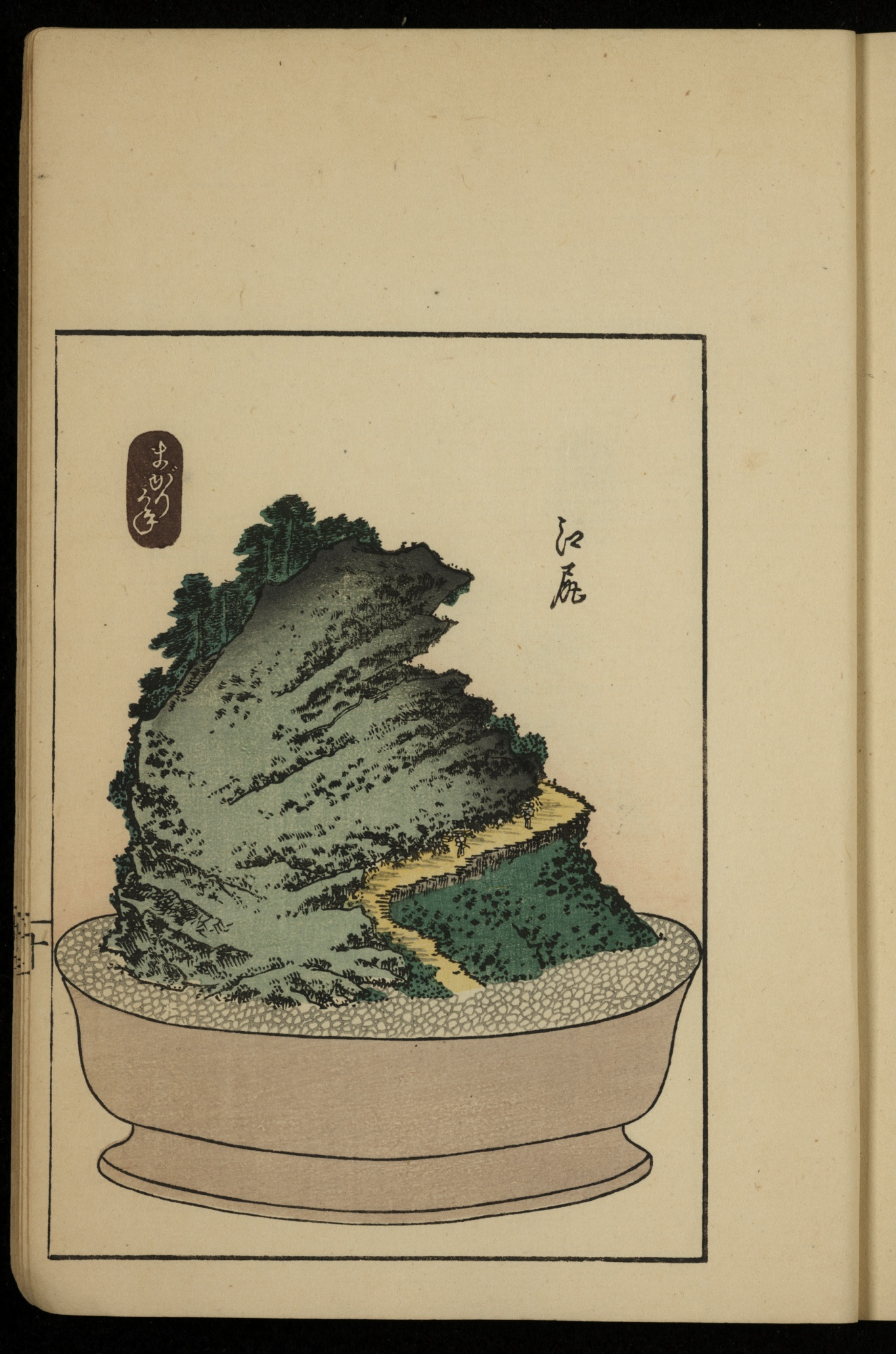
Color print depicting a bonkei modeled after The Fifty-three Stations of the Tōkaidō, print A-19

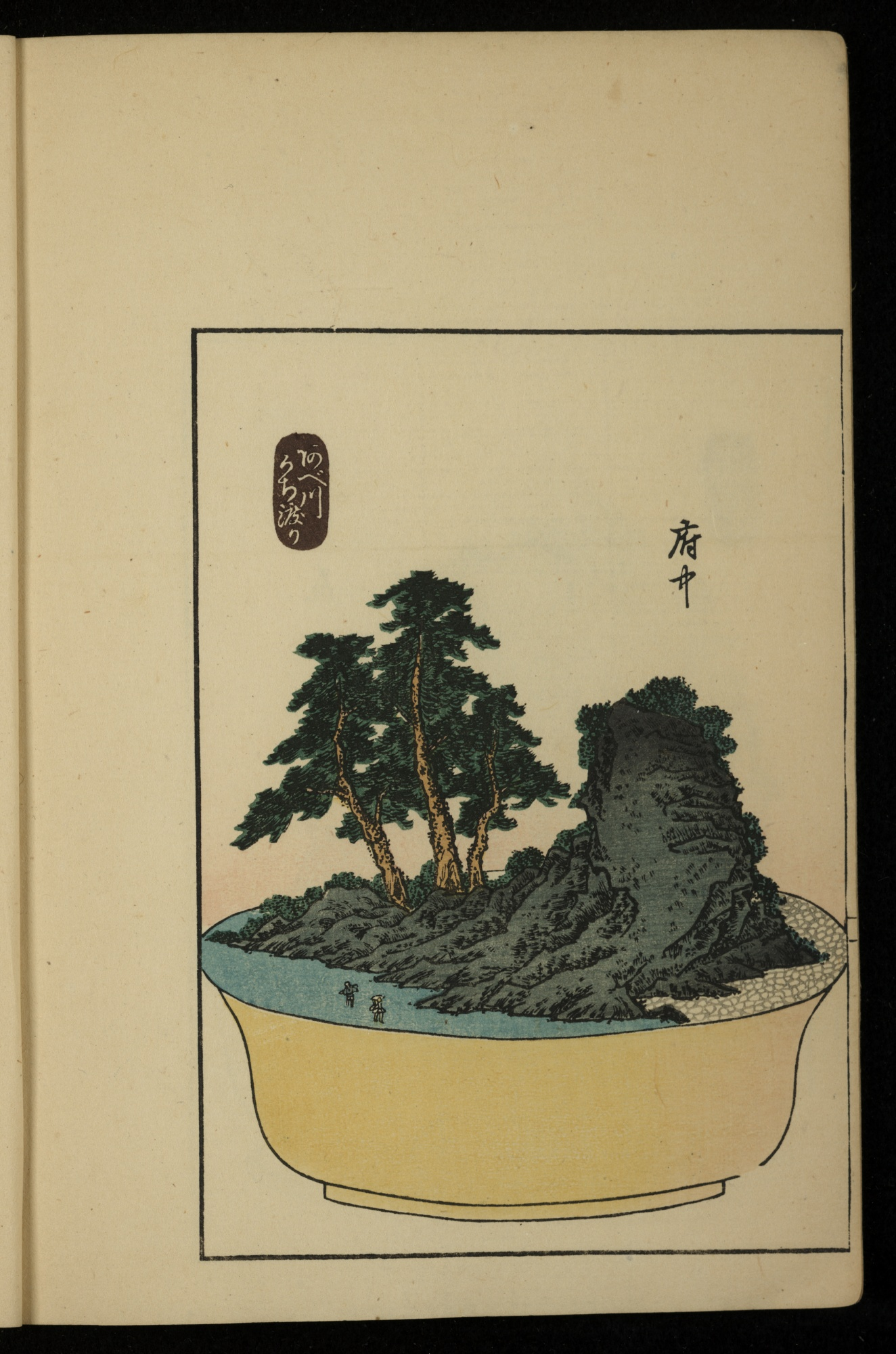
Color print depicting a bonkei modeled after The Fifty-three Stations of the Tōkaidō, print A-20

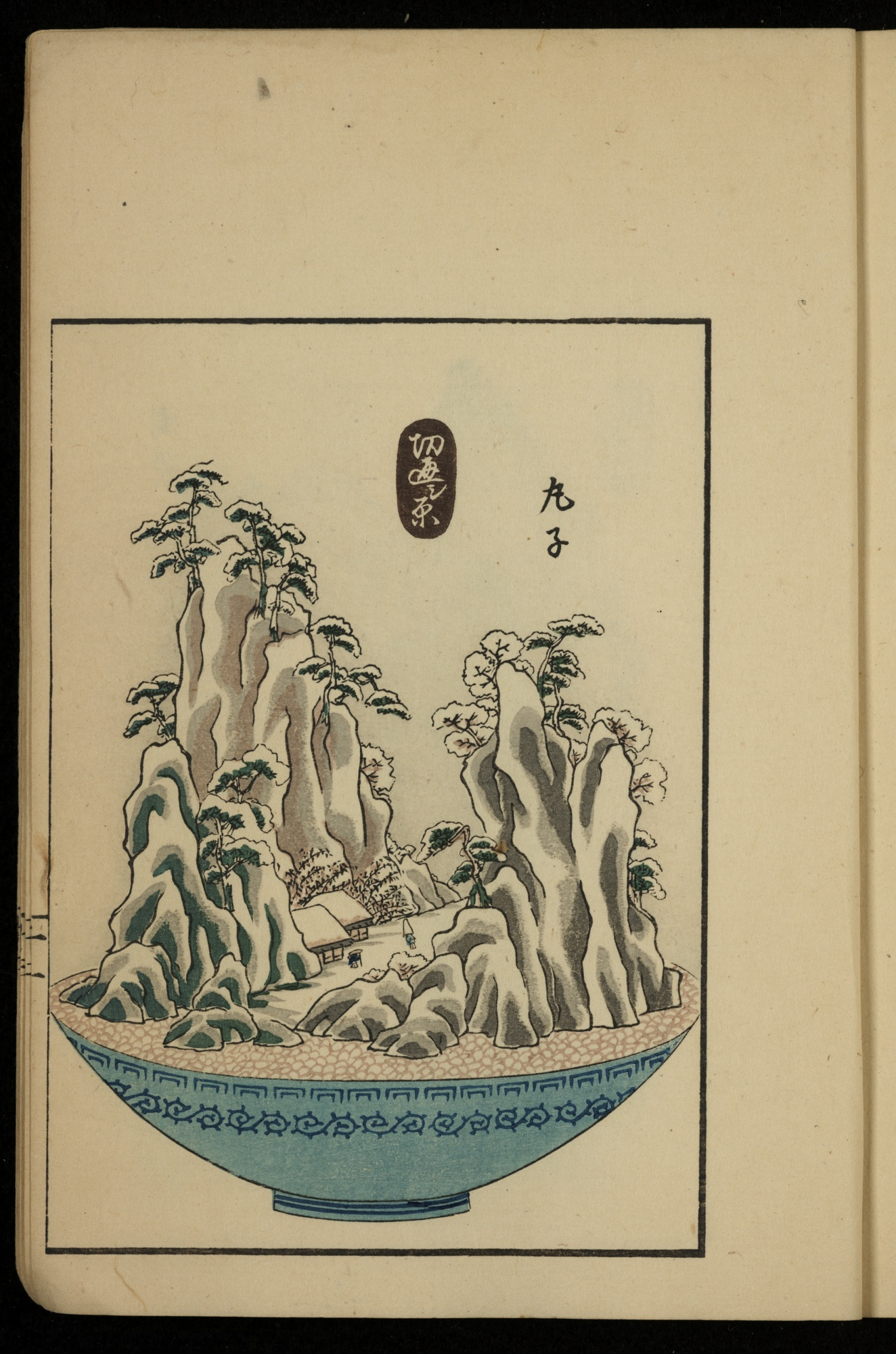
Color print depicting a bonkei modeled after The Fifty-three Stations of the Tōkaidō, print A-21

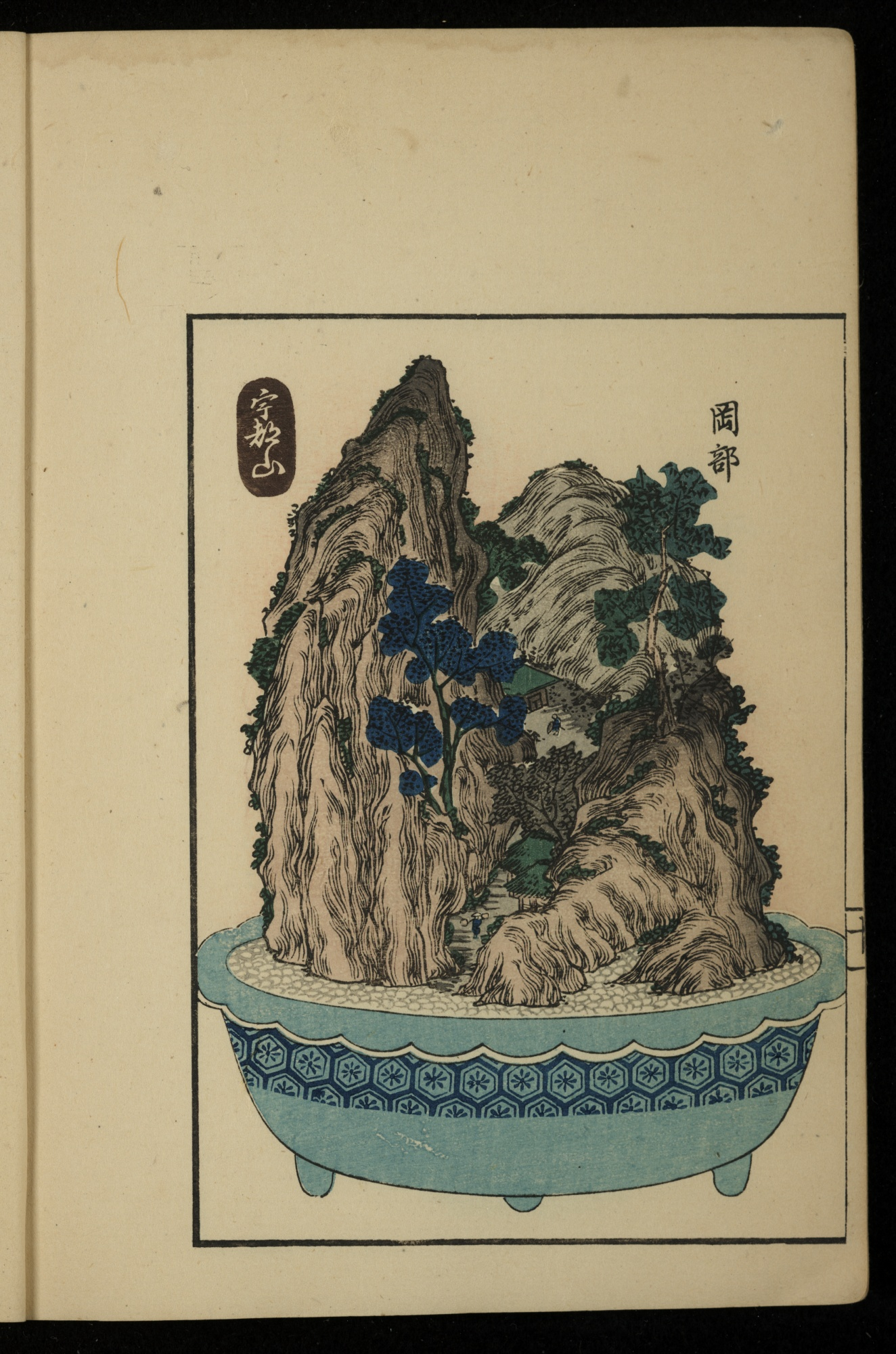
Color print depicting a bonkei modeled after The Fifty-three Stations of the Tōkaidō, print A-22

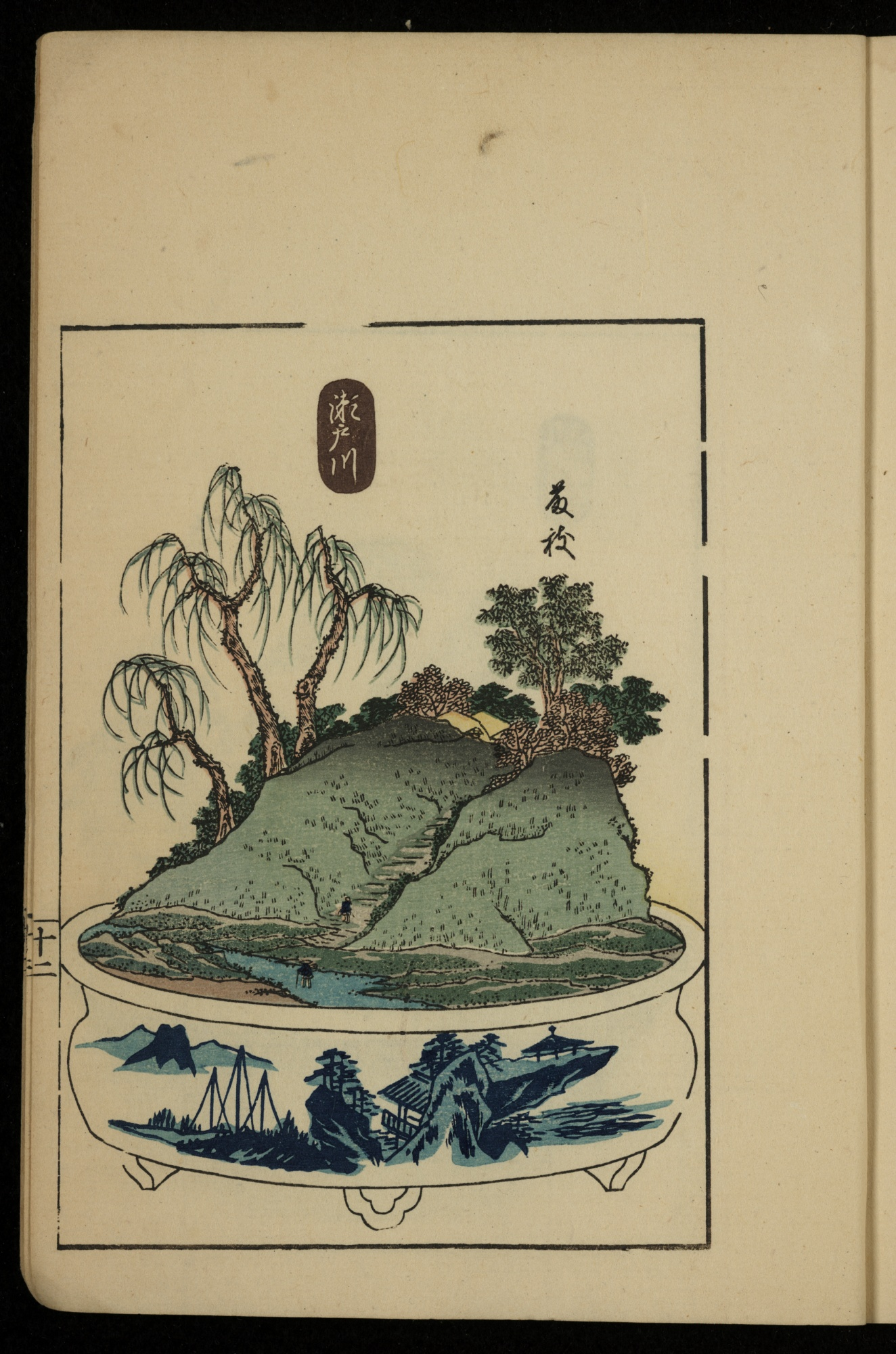
Color print depicting a bonkei modeled after The Fifty-three Stations of the Tōkaidō, print A-23

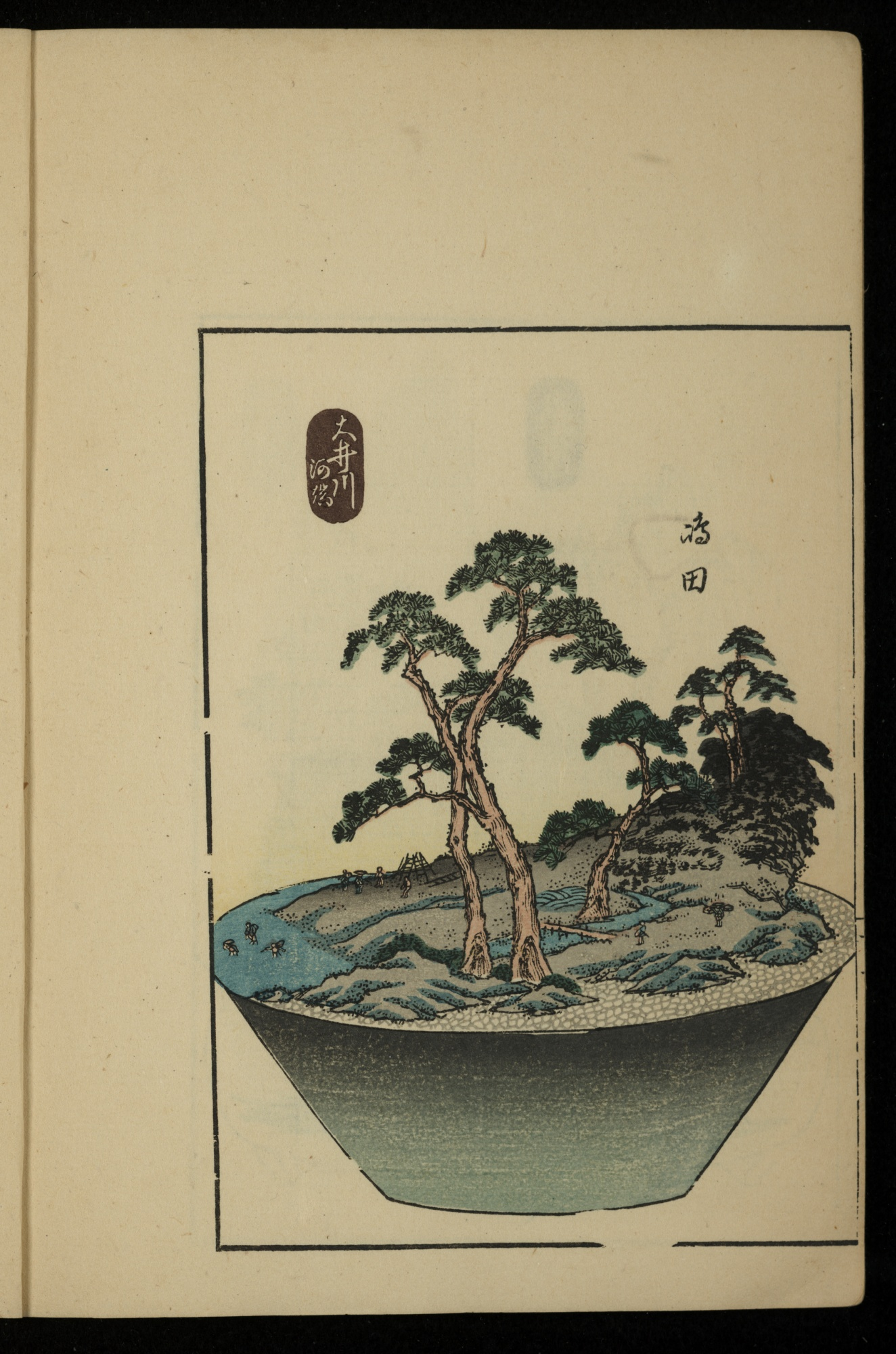
Color print depicting a bonkei modeled after The Fifty-three Stations of the Tōkaidō, print A-24

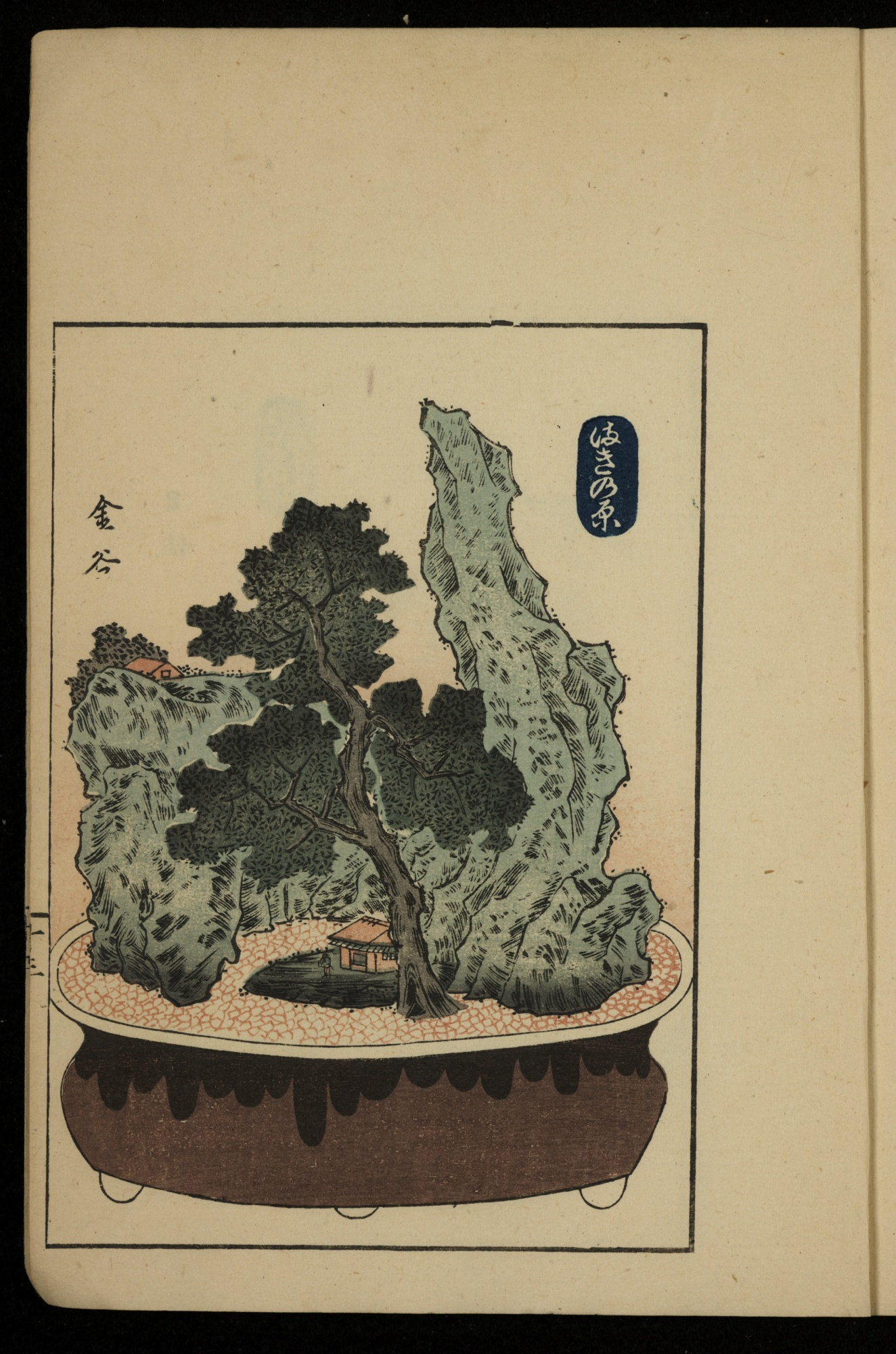
Color print depicting a bonkei modeled after The Fifty-three Stations of the Tōkaidō, print A-25

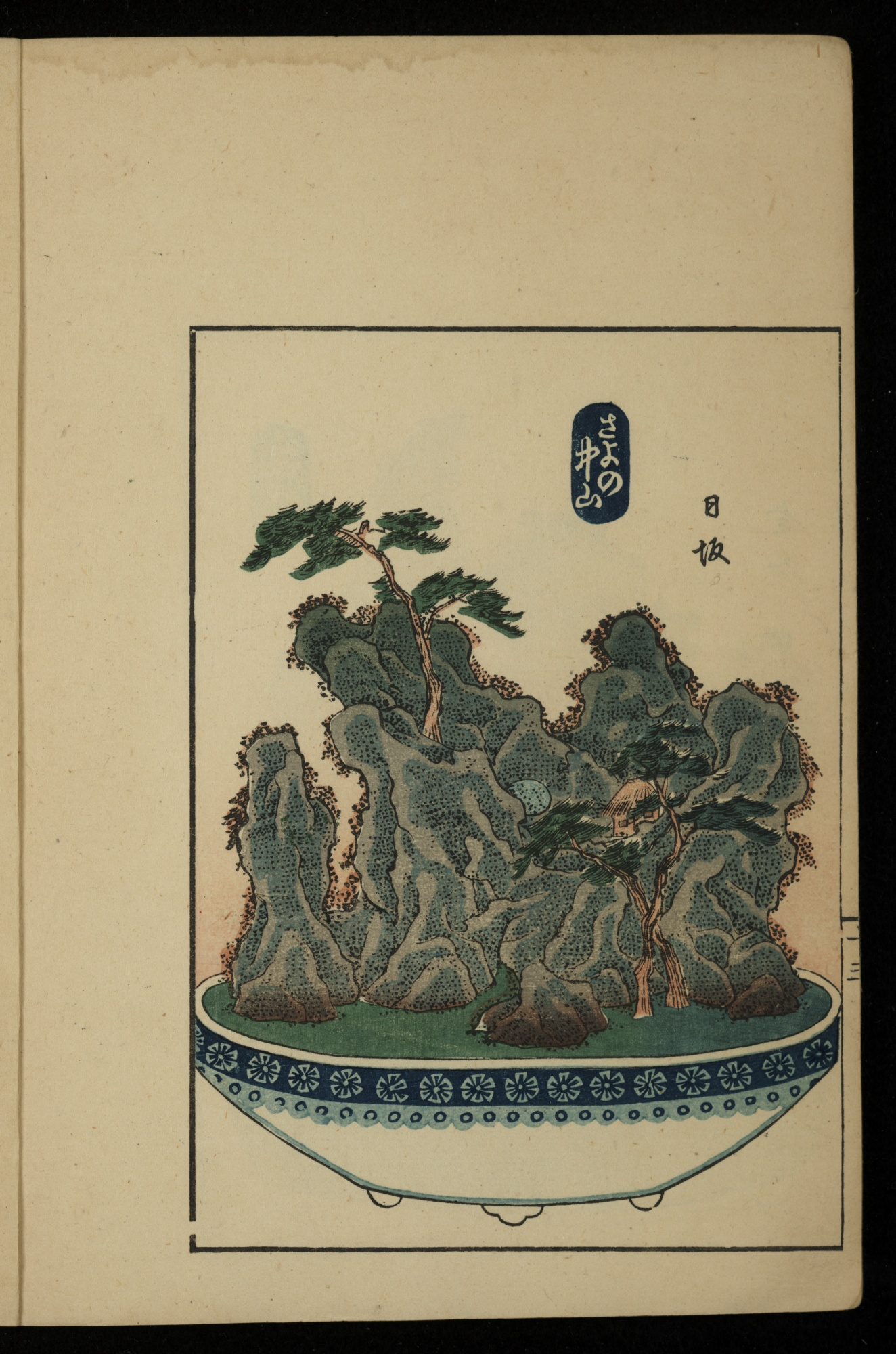
Color print depicting a bonkei modeled after The Fifty-three Stations of the Tōkaidō, print A-26

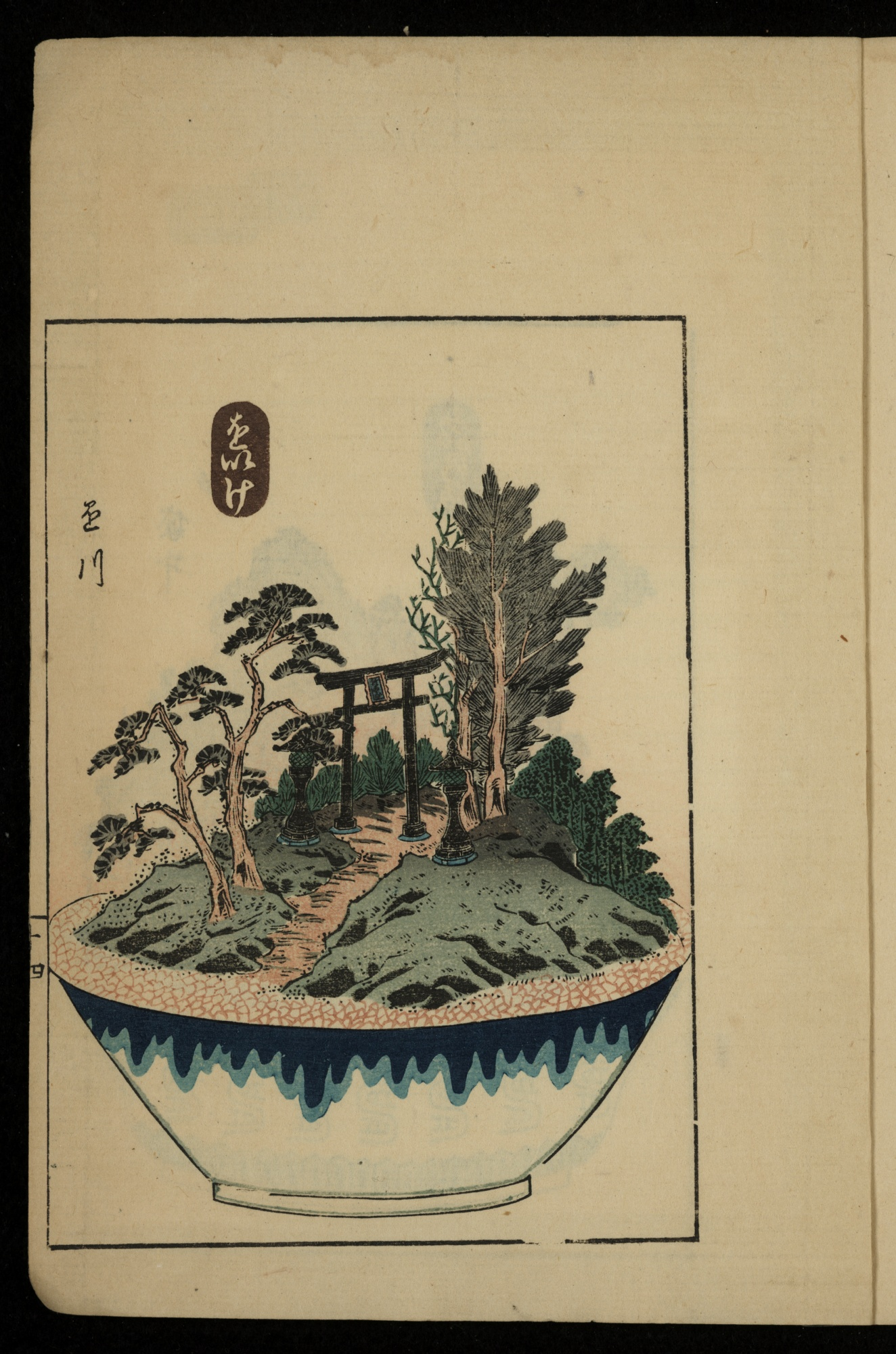
Color print depicting a bonkei modeled after The Fifty-three Stations of the Tōkaidō, print A-27

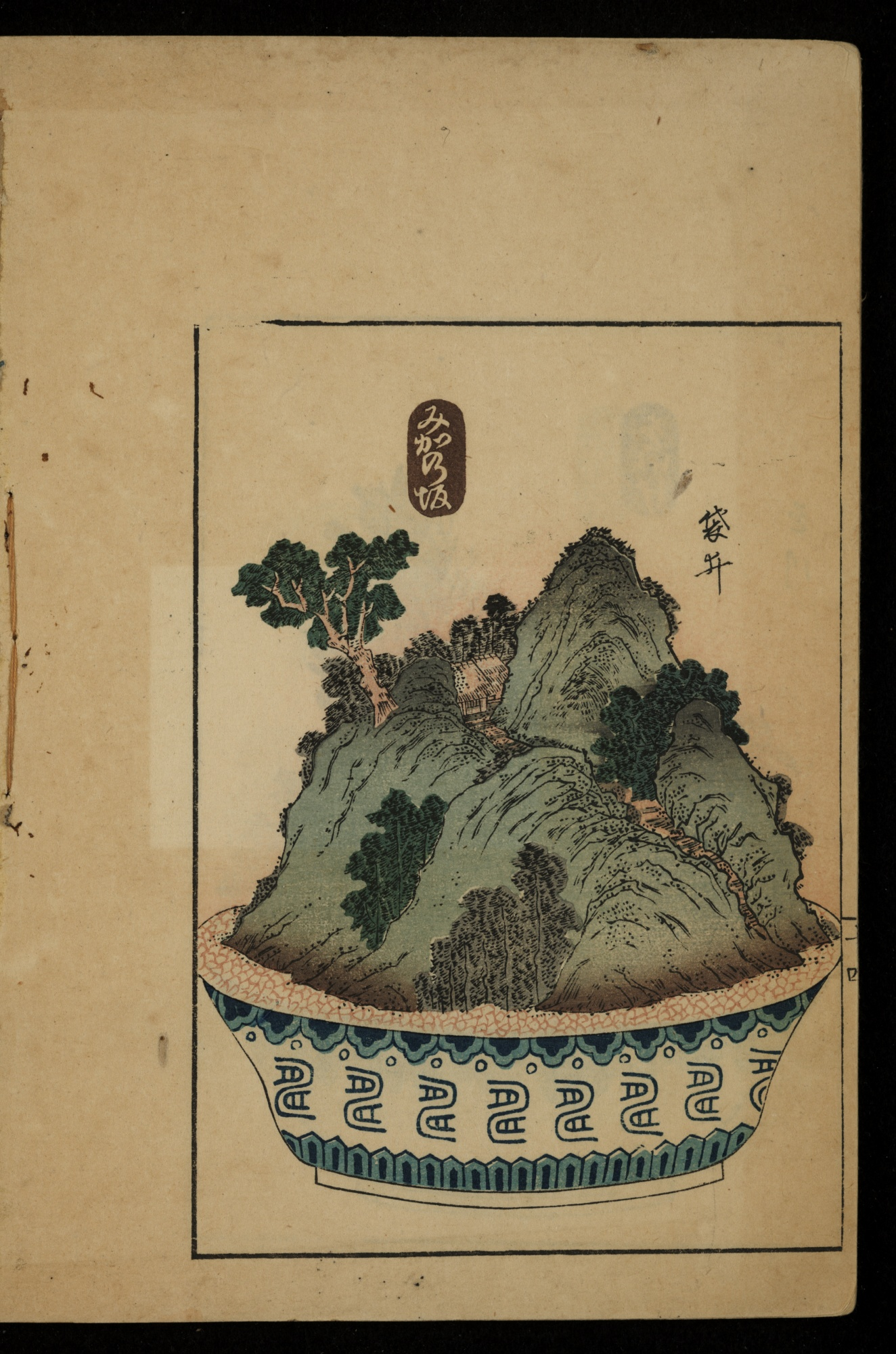
Color print depicting a bonkei modeled after The Fifty-three Stations of the Tōkaidō, print A-28

=== Volume II ===
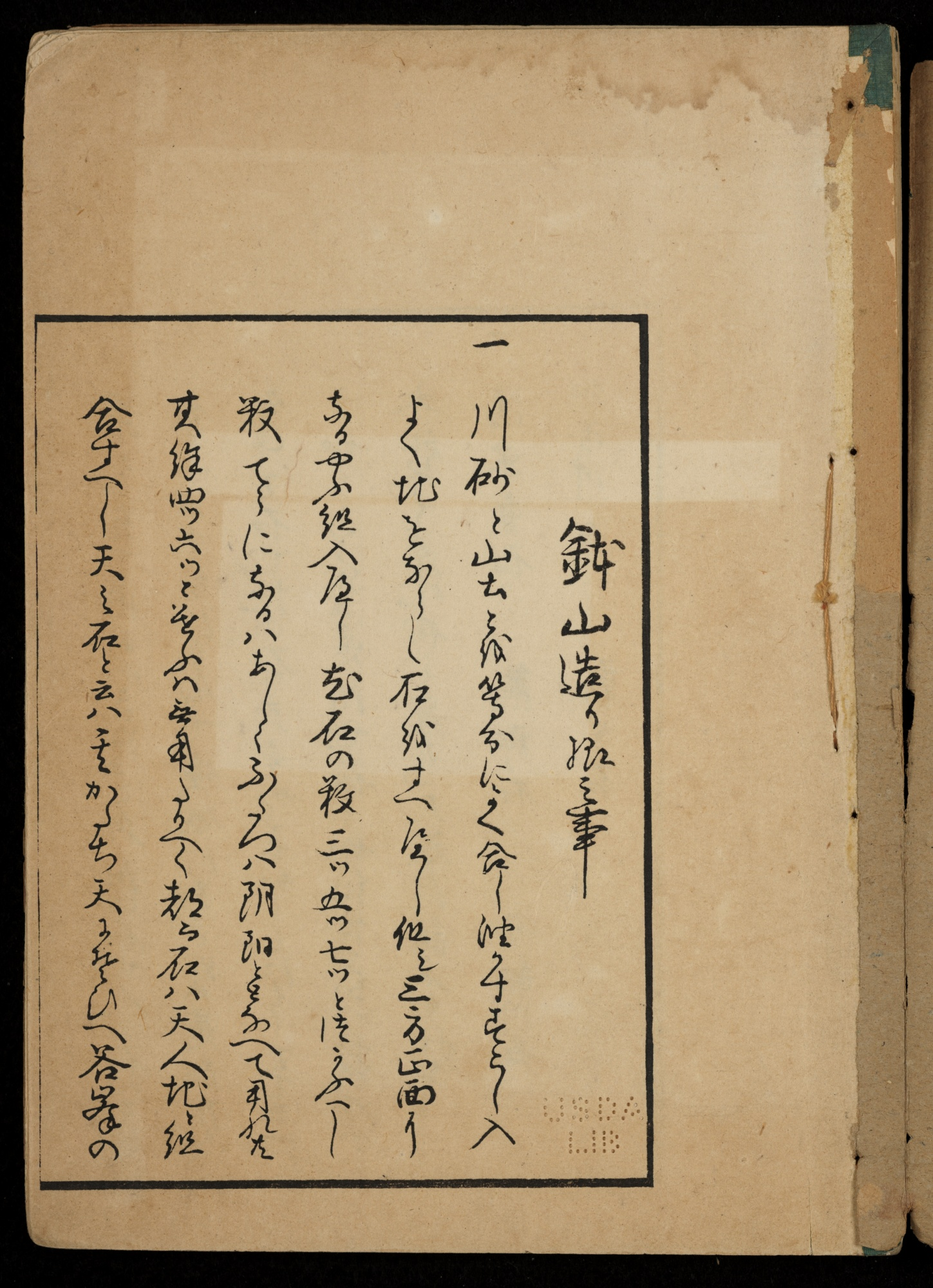
Color print depicting preface, page 01

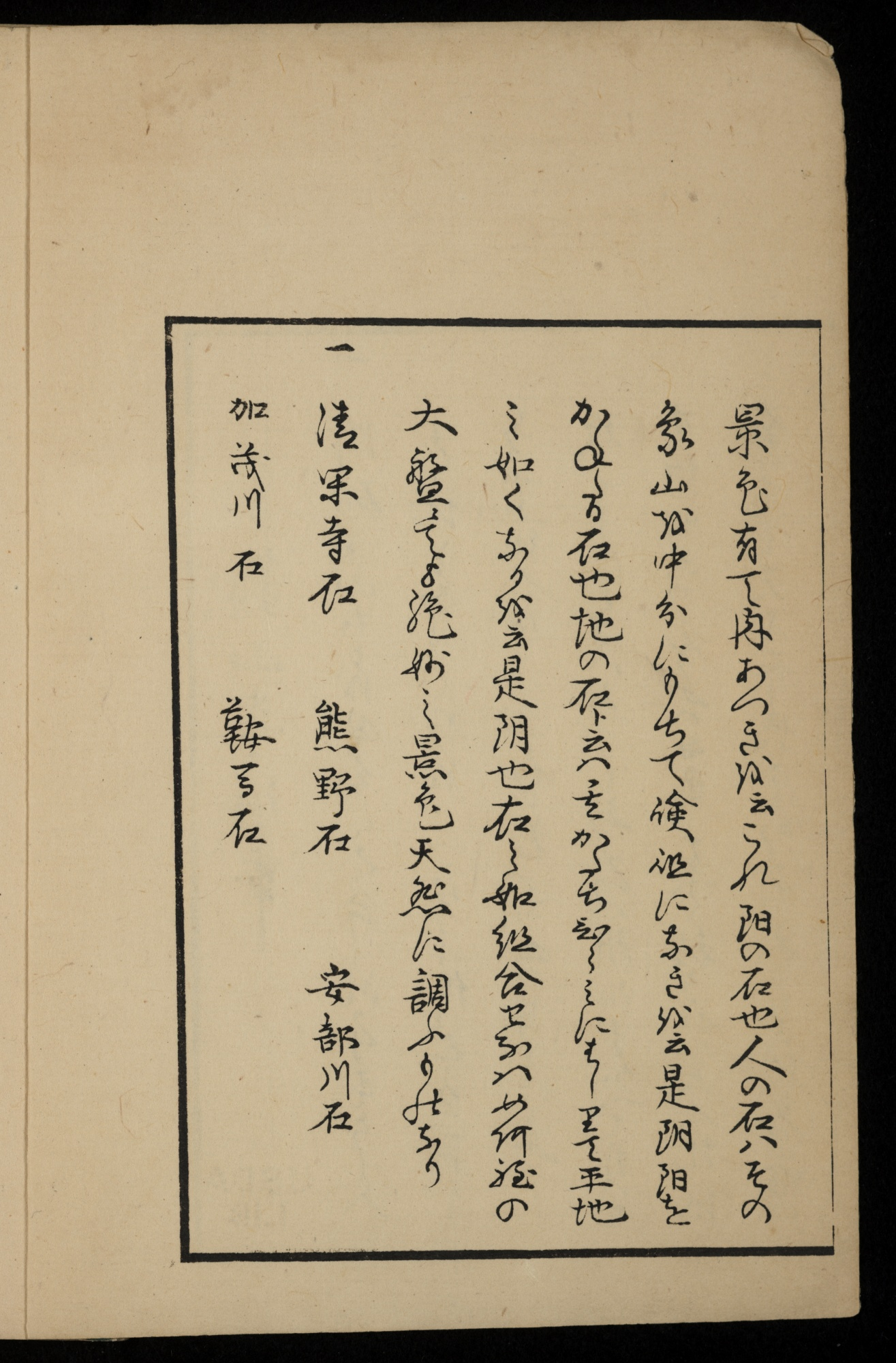
Color print depicting preface, page 02

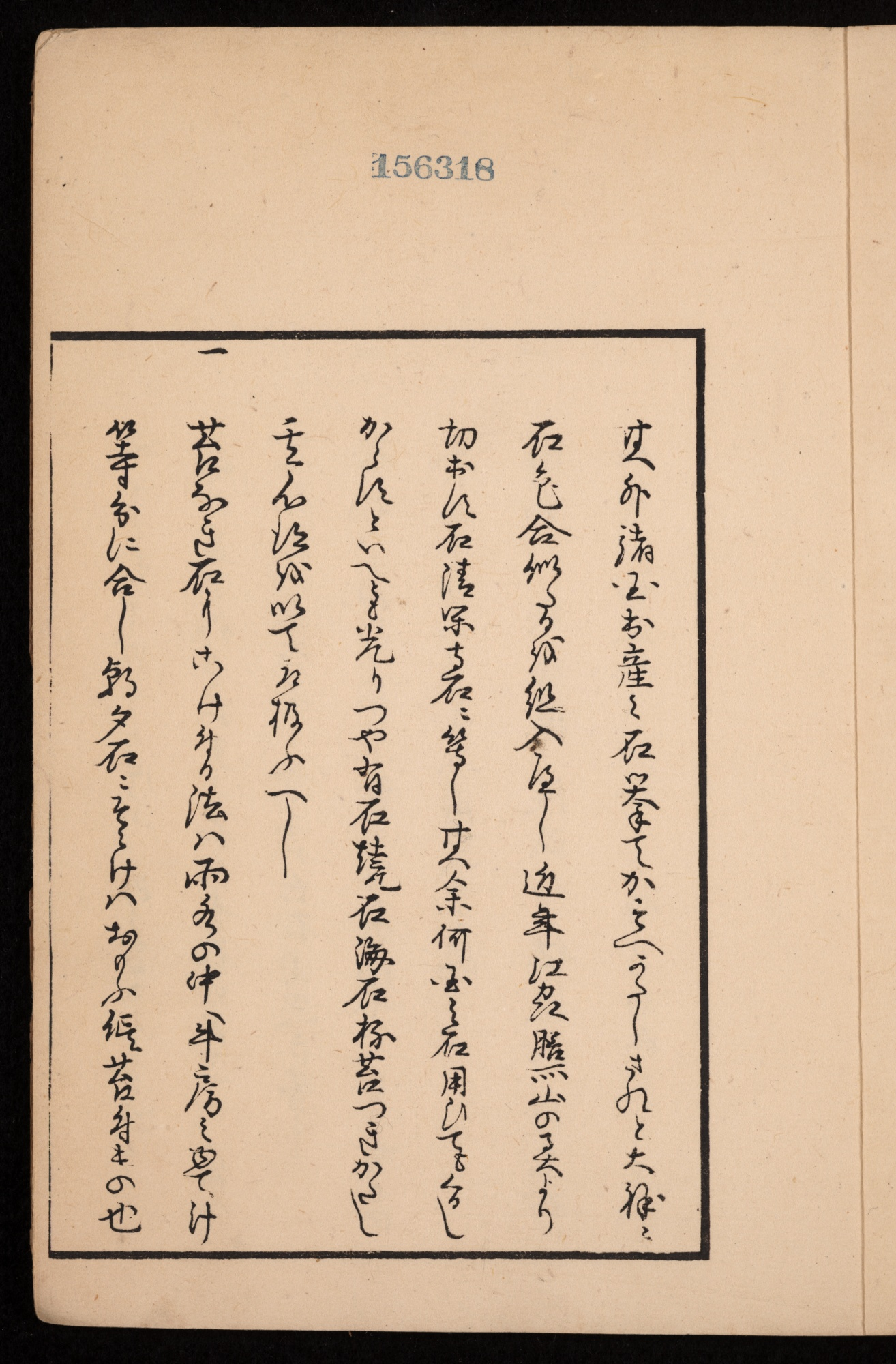
Color print depicting preface, page 03

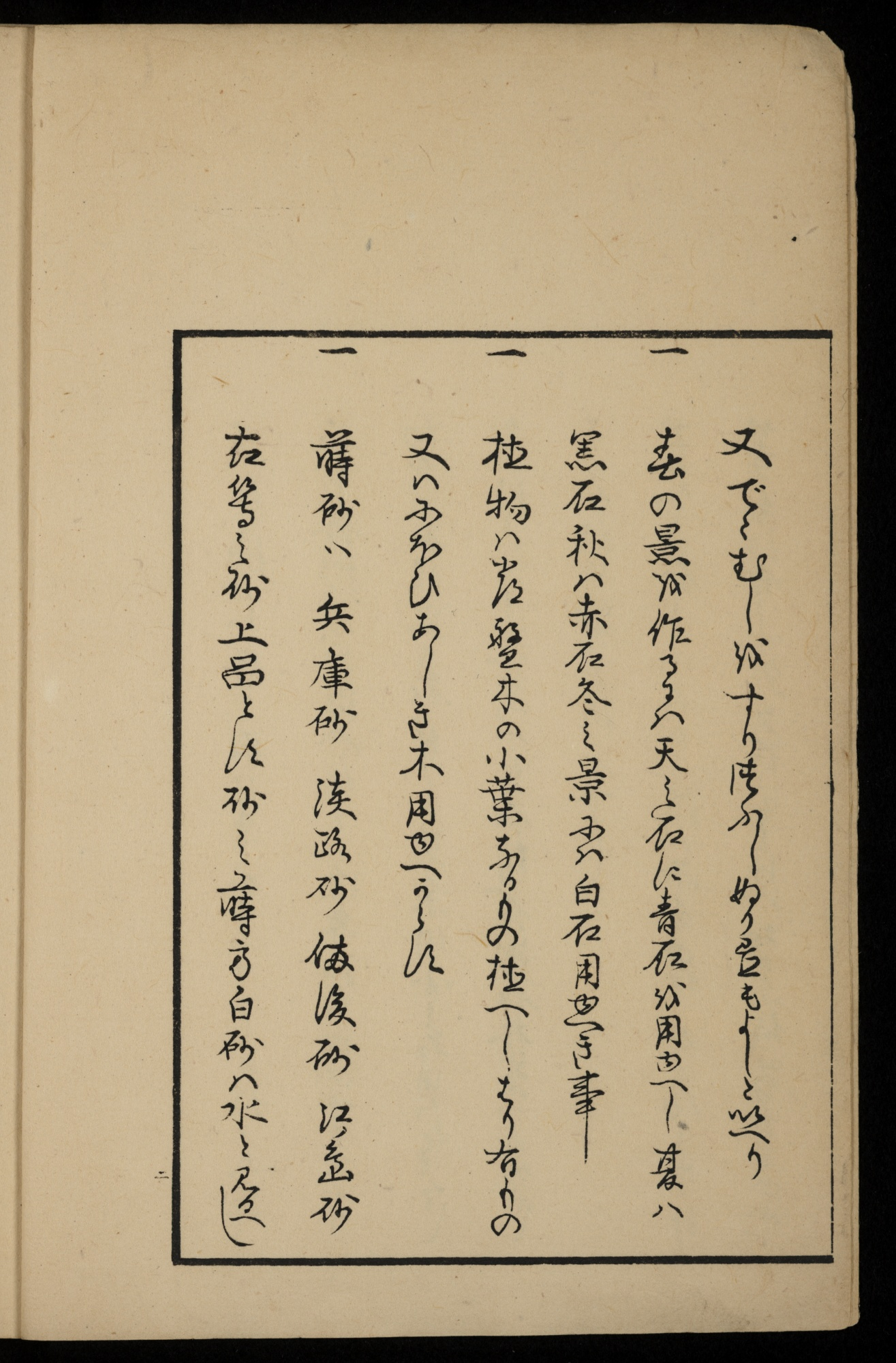
Color print depicting preface, page 04

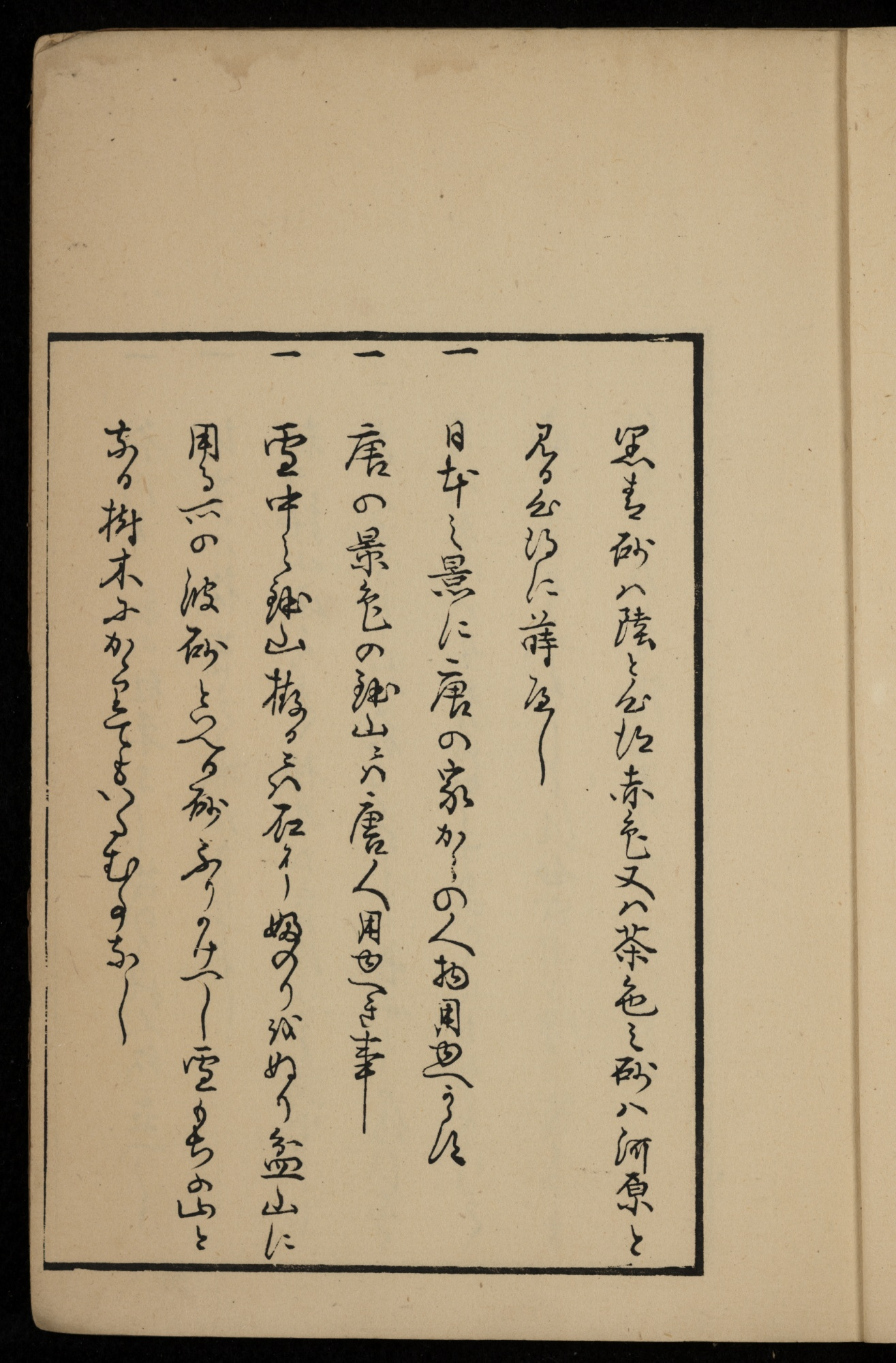
Color print depicting preface, page 05

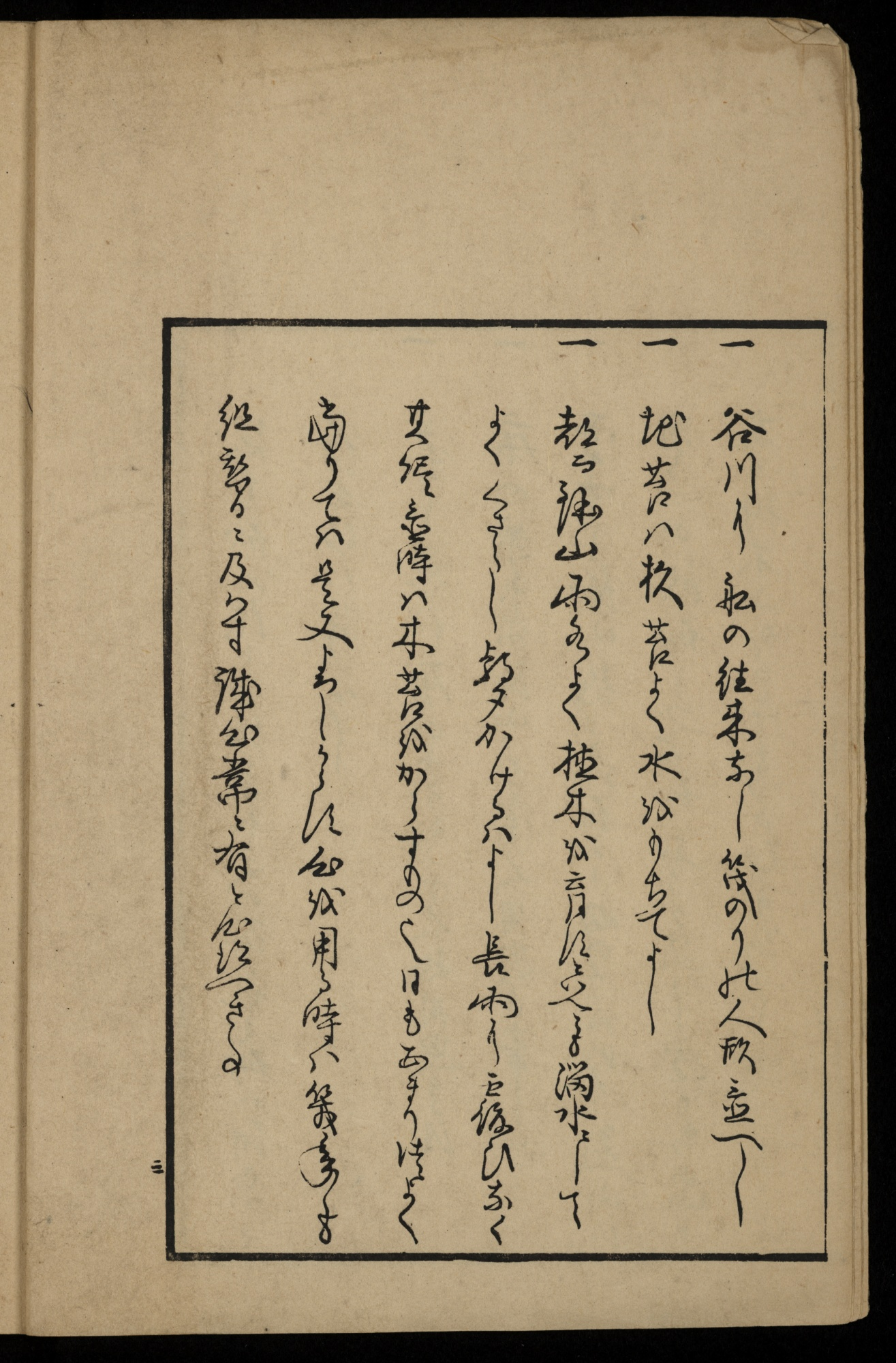
Color print depicting preface, page 06

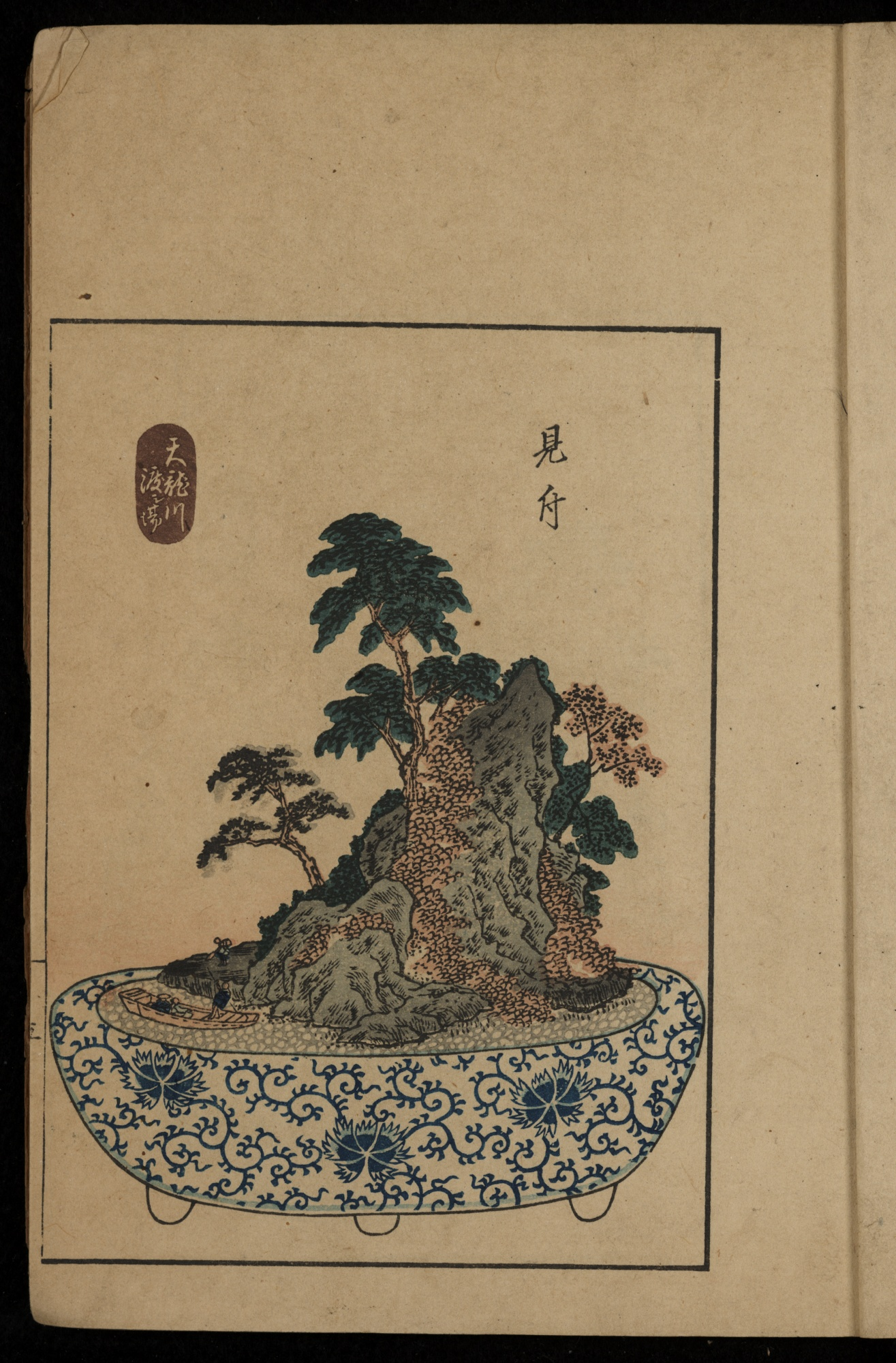
Color print depicting a bonkei modeled after The Fifty-three Stations of the Tōkaidō, print B-29

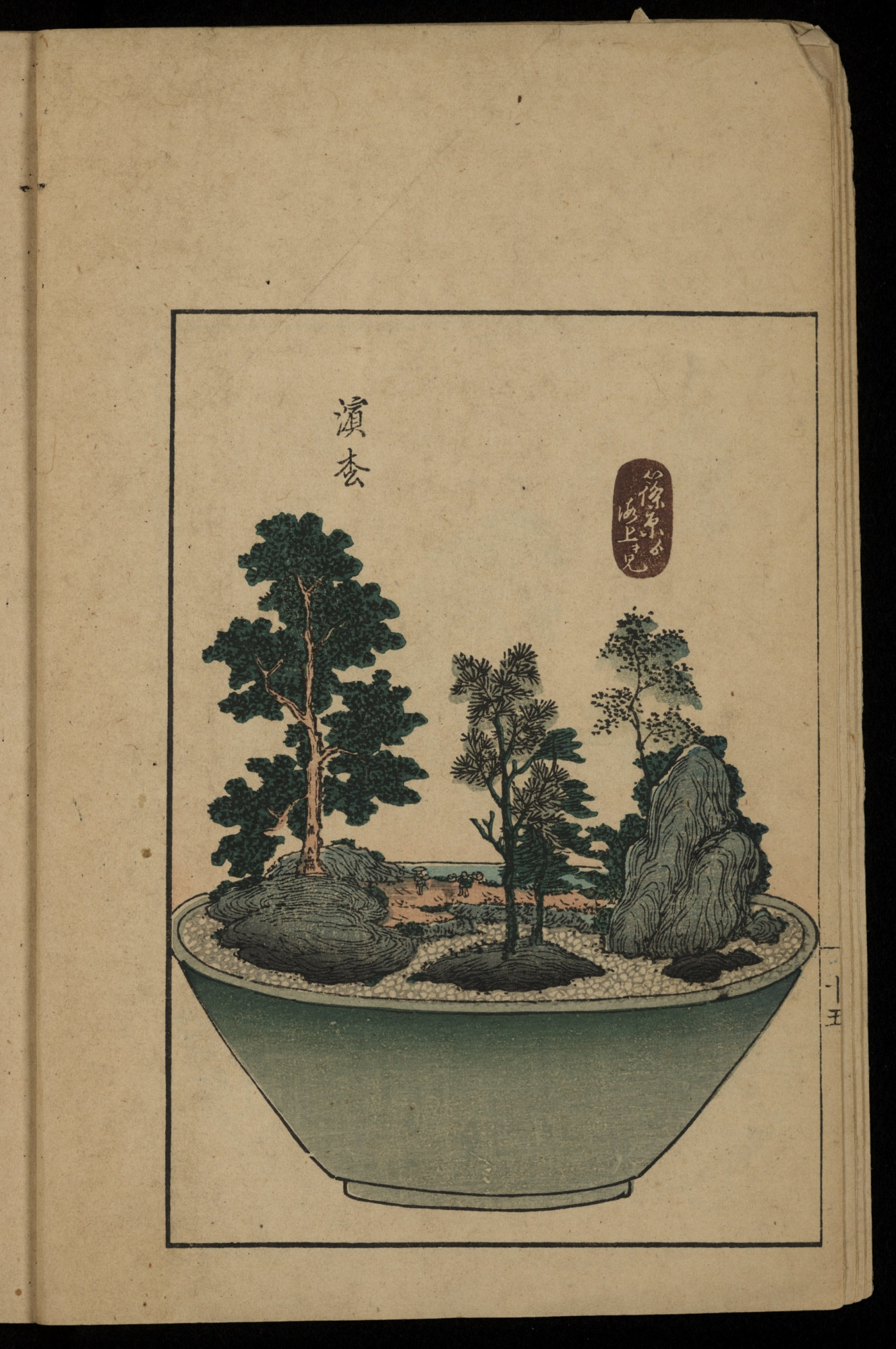
Color print depicting a bonkei modeled after The Fifty-three Stations of the Tōkaidō, print B-30

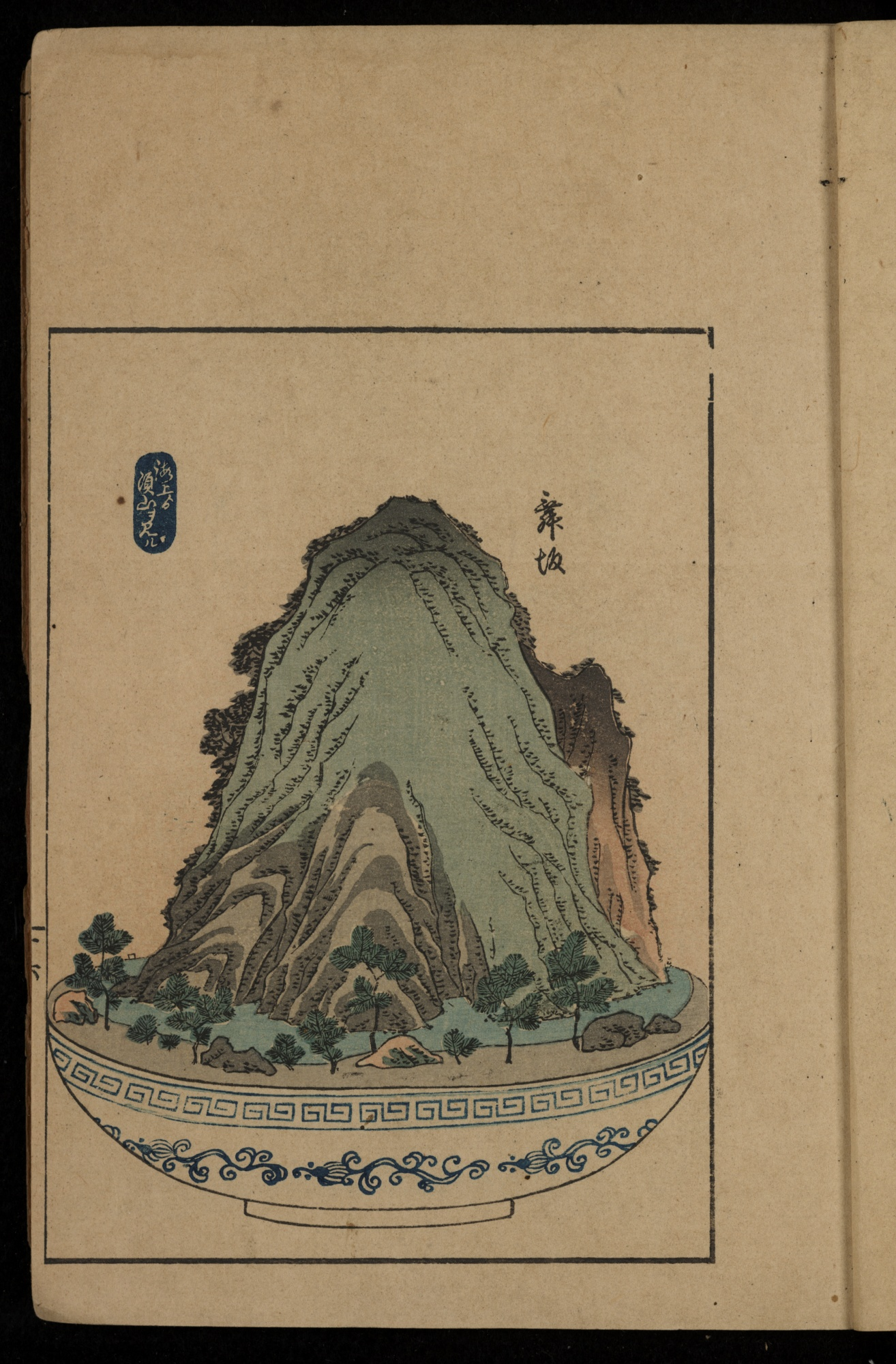
Color print depicting a bonkei modeled after The Fifty-three Stations of the Tōkaidō, print B-31

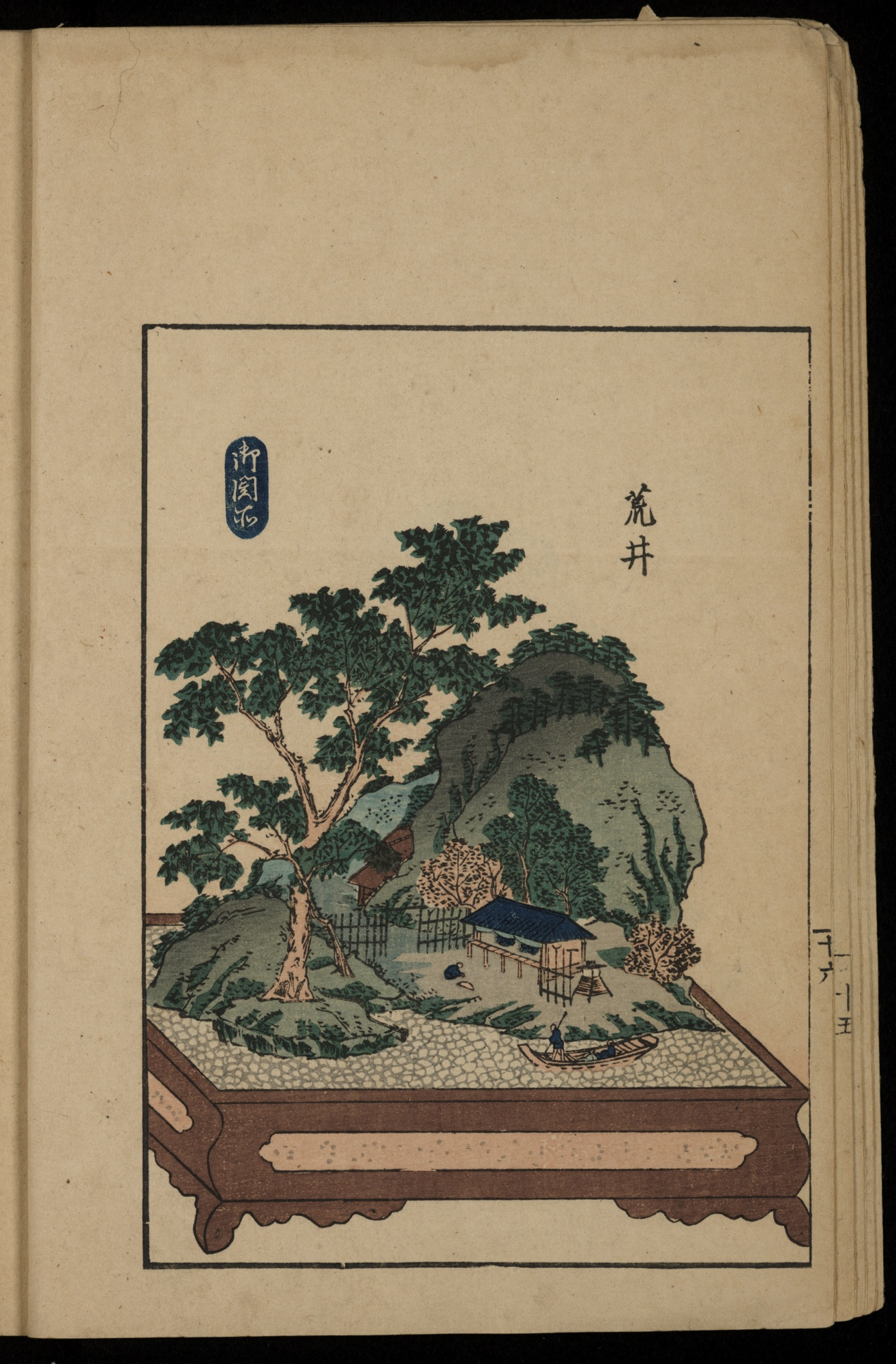
Color print depicting a bonkei modeled after The Fifty-three Stations of the Tōkaidō, print B-32

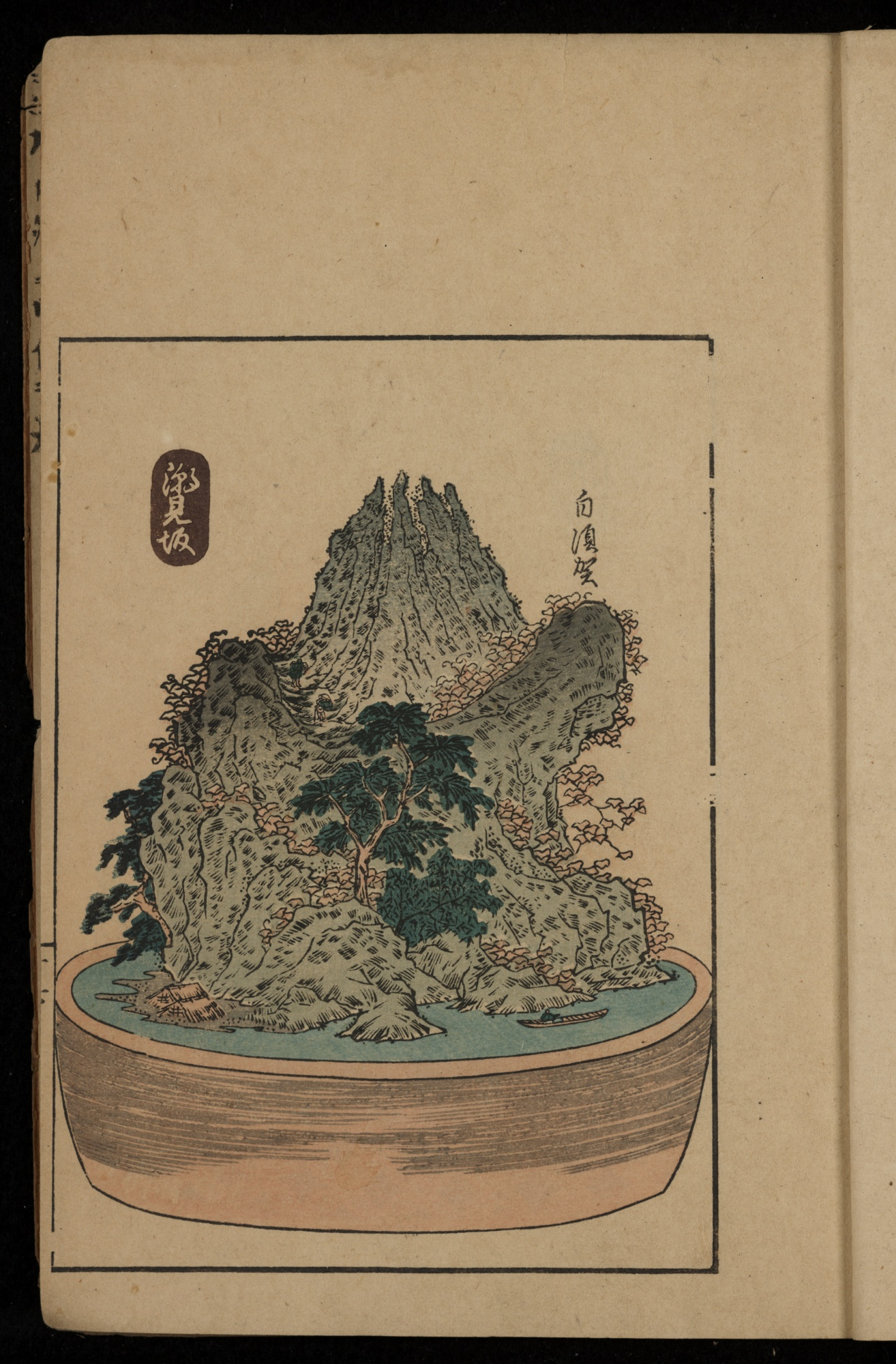
Color print depicting a bonkei modeled after The Fifty-three Stations of the Tōkaidō, print B-33

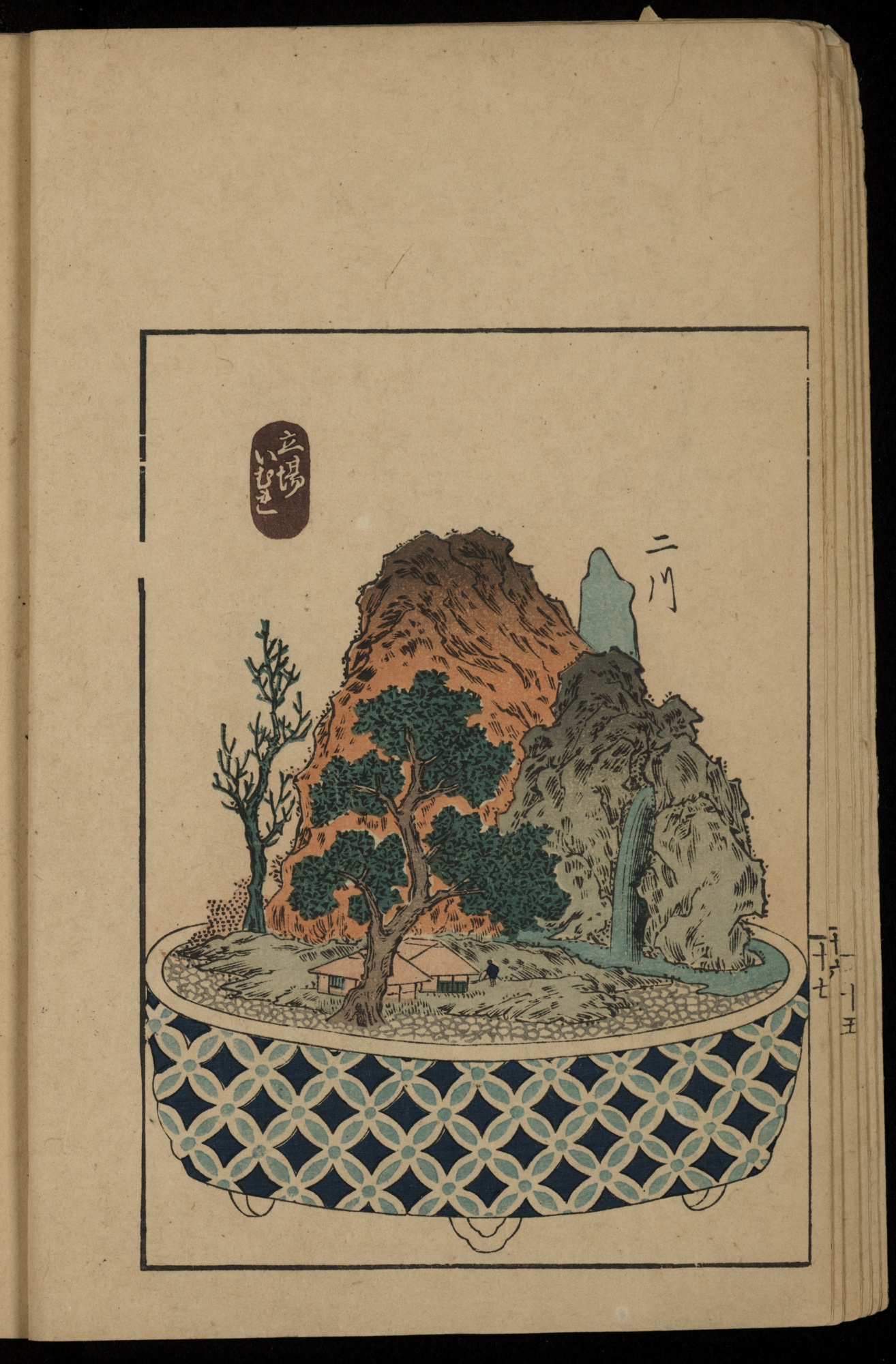
Color print depicting a bonkei modeled after The Fifty-three Stations of the Tōkaidō, print B-34

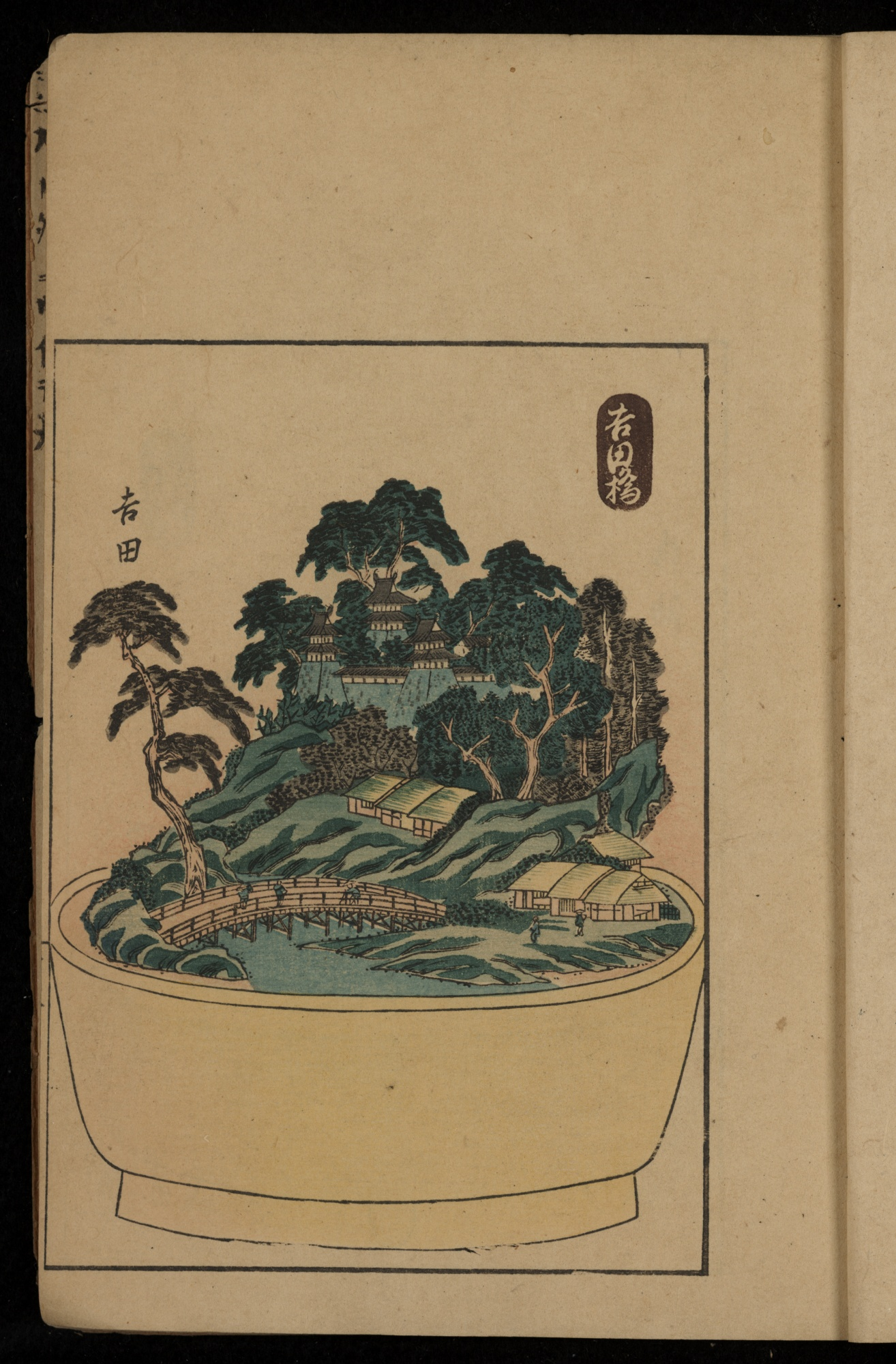
Color print depicting a bonkei modeled after The Fifty-three Stations of the Tōkaidō, print B-35

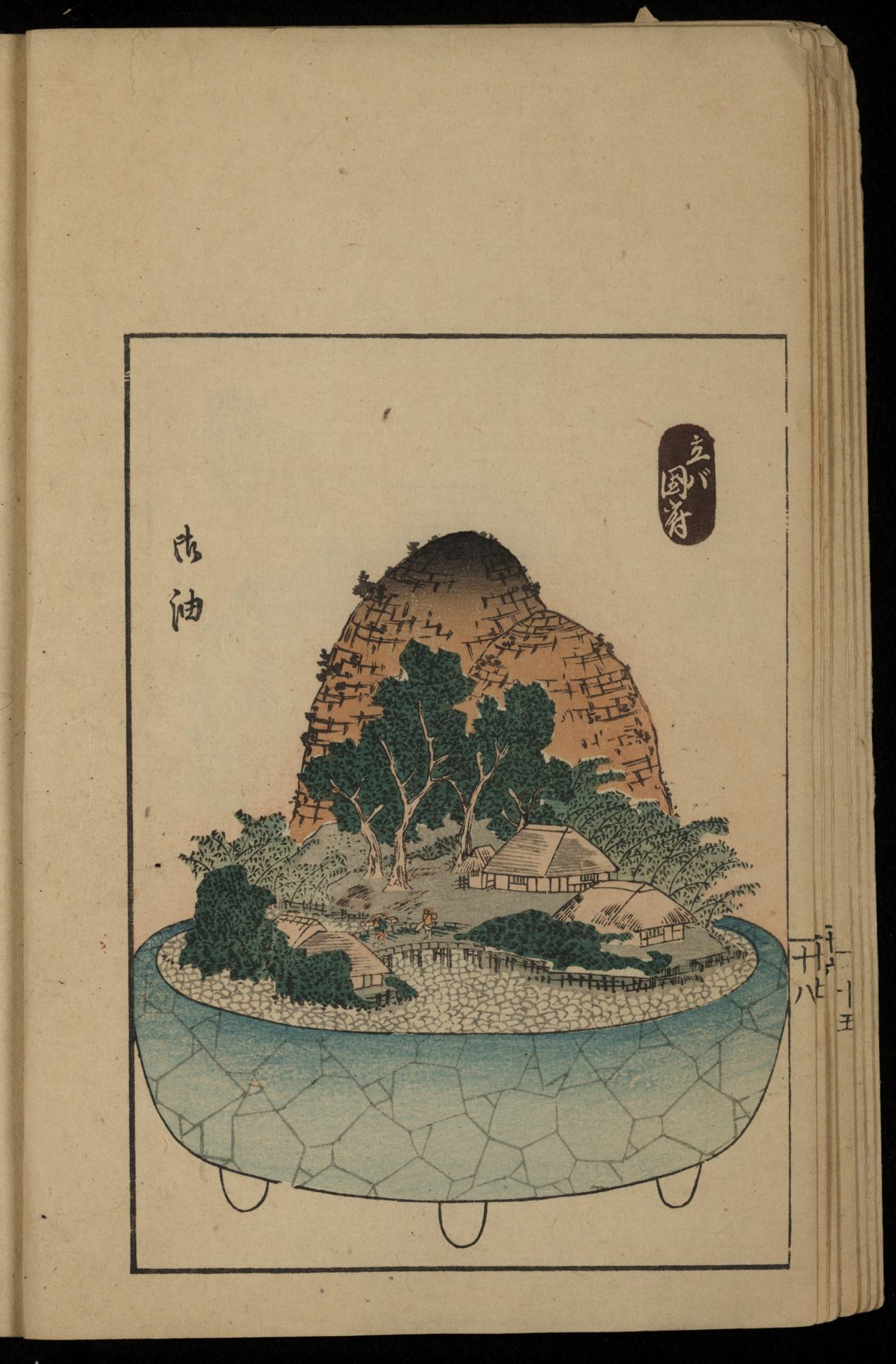
Color print depicting a bonkei modeled after The Fifty-three Stations of the Tōkaidō, print B-36

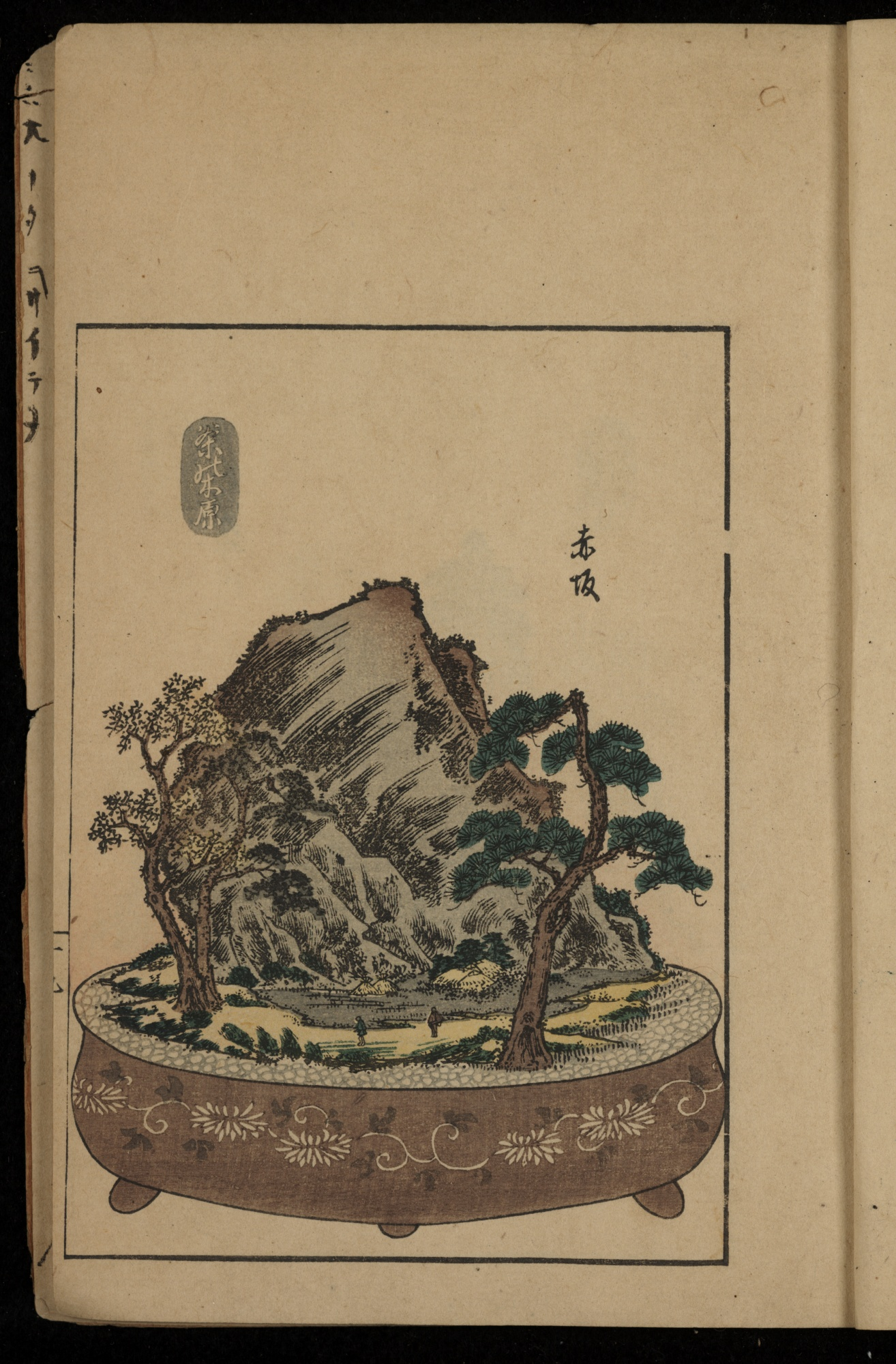
Color print depicting a bonkei modeled after The Fifty-three Stations of the Tōkaidō, print B-37

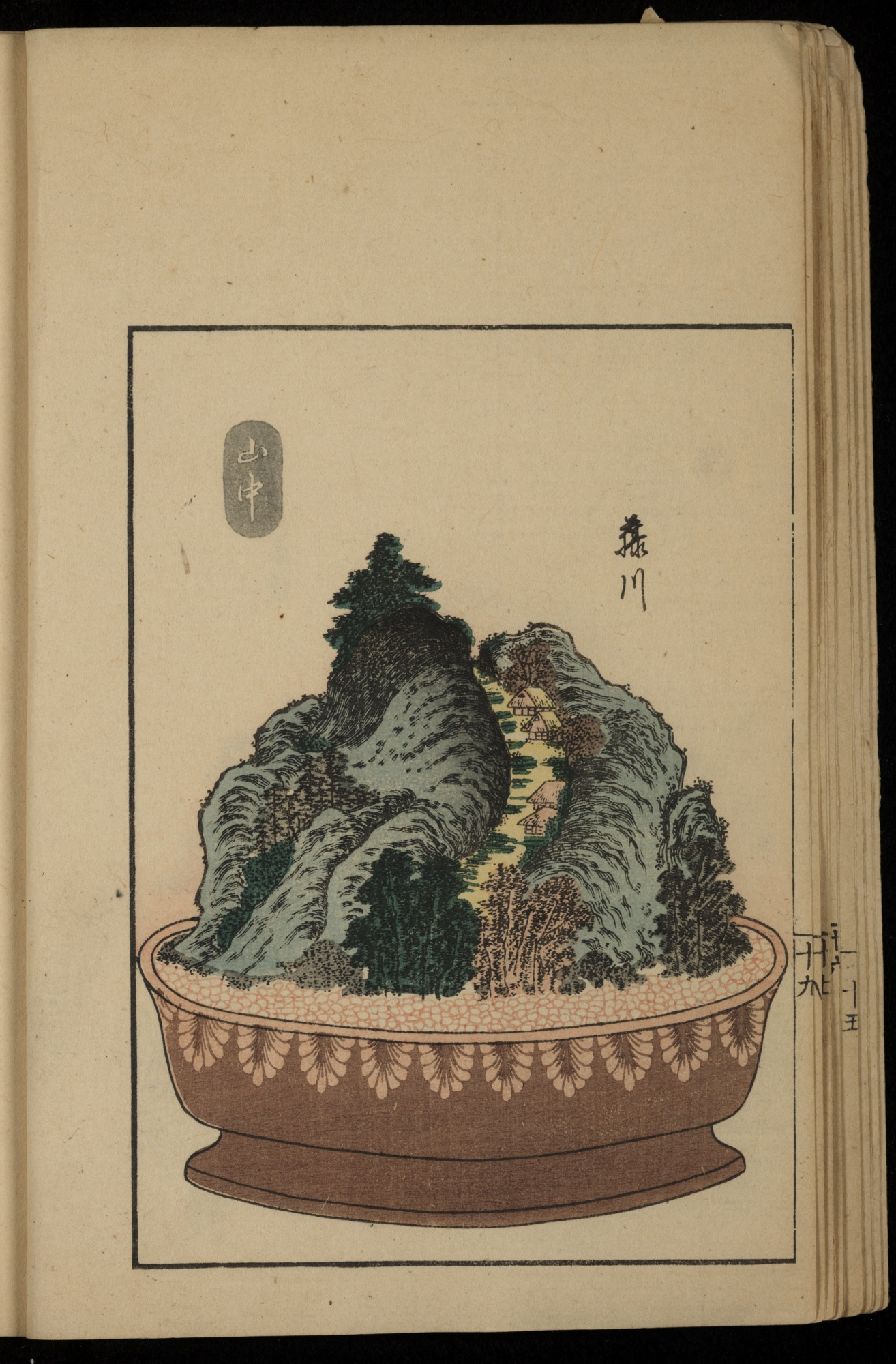
Color print depicting a bonkei modeled after The Fifty-three Stations of the Tōkaidō, print B-38

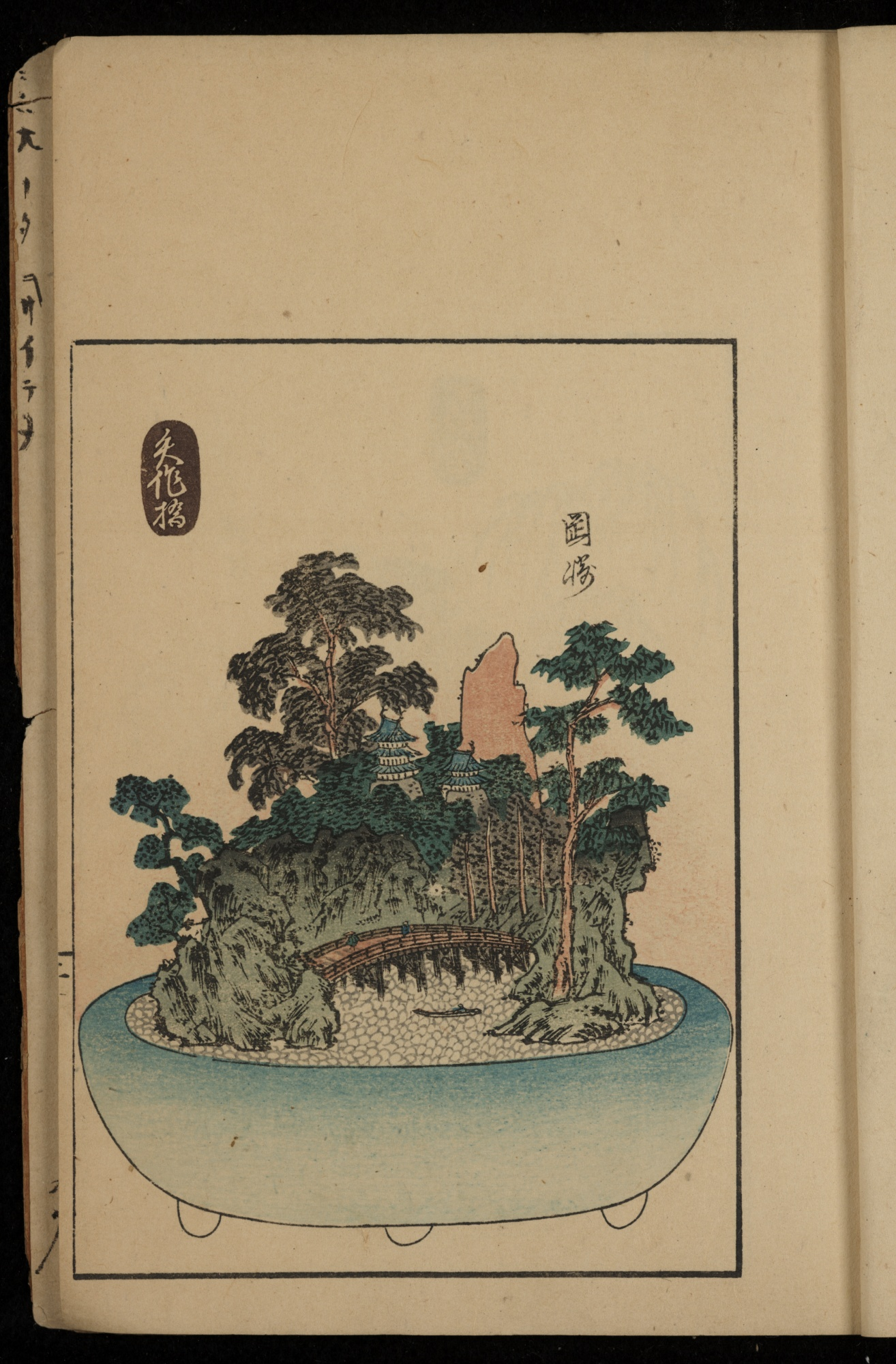
Color print depicting a bonkei modeled after The Fifty-three Stations of the Tōkaidō, print B-39

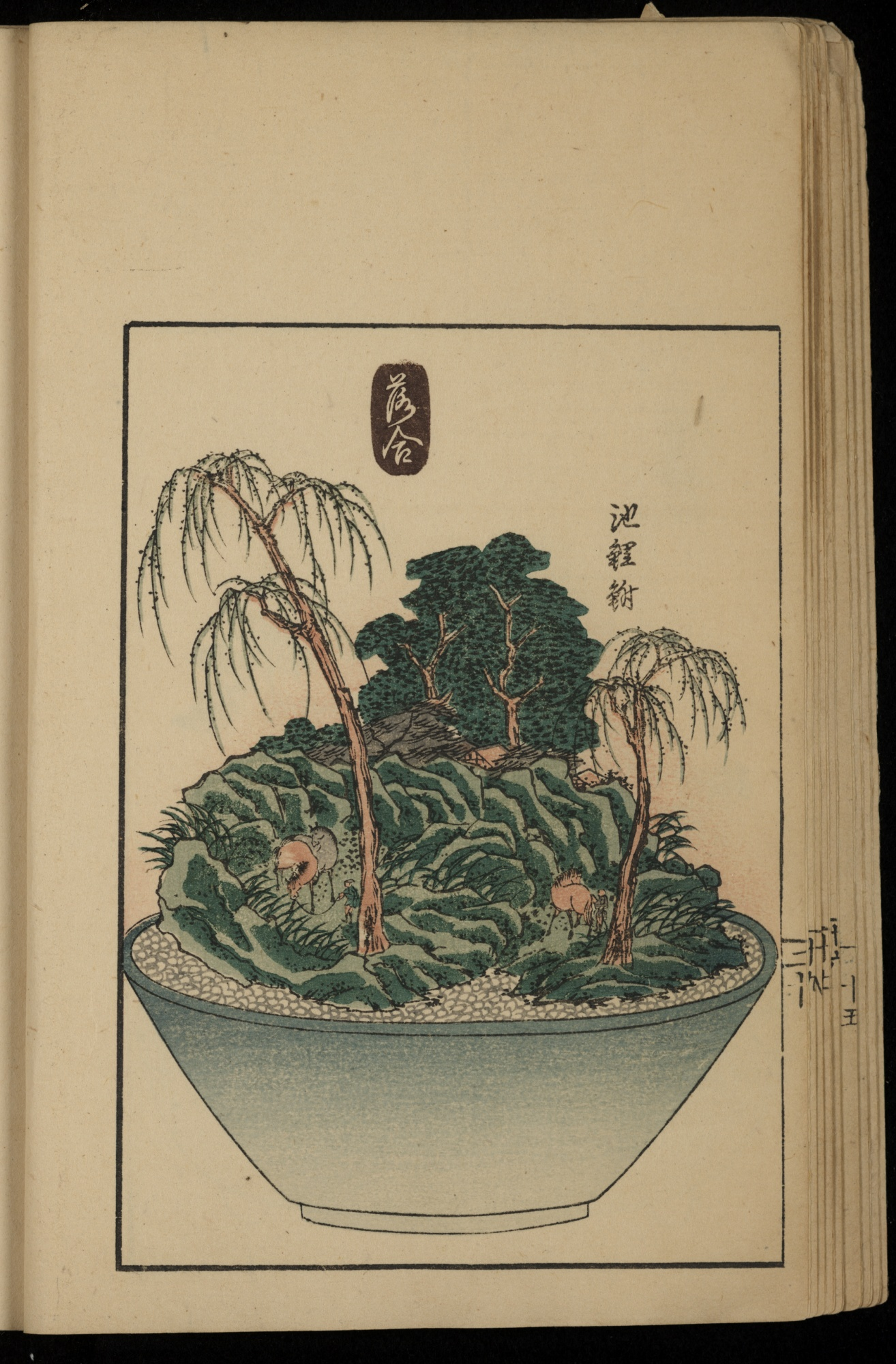
Color print depicting a bonkei modeled after The Fifty-three Stations of the Tōkaidō, print B-40

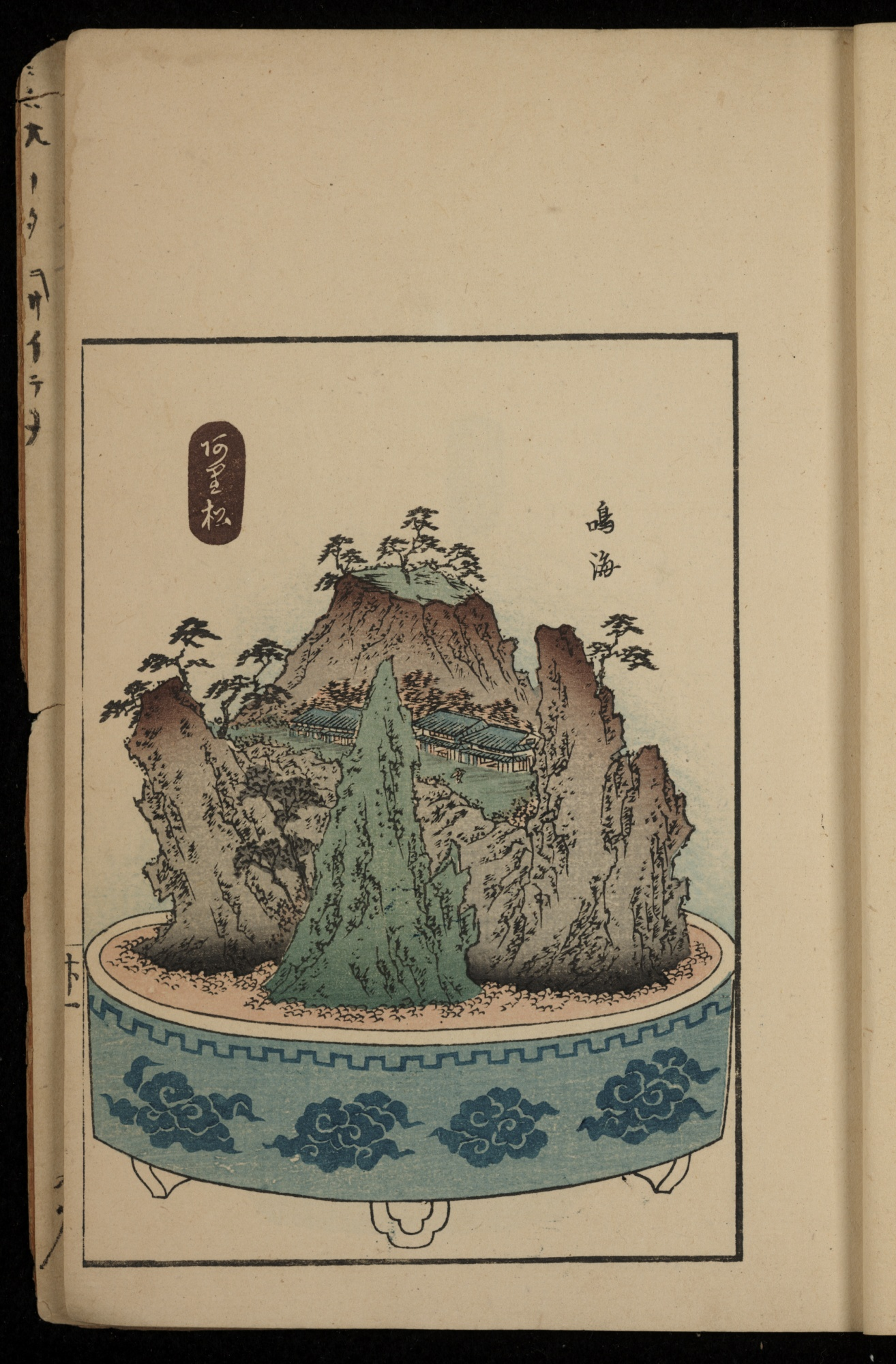
Color print depicting a bonkei modeled after The Fifty-three Stations of the Tōkaidō, print B-41

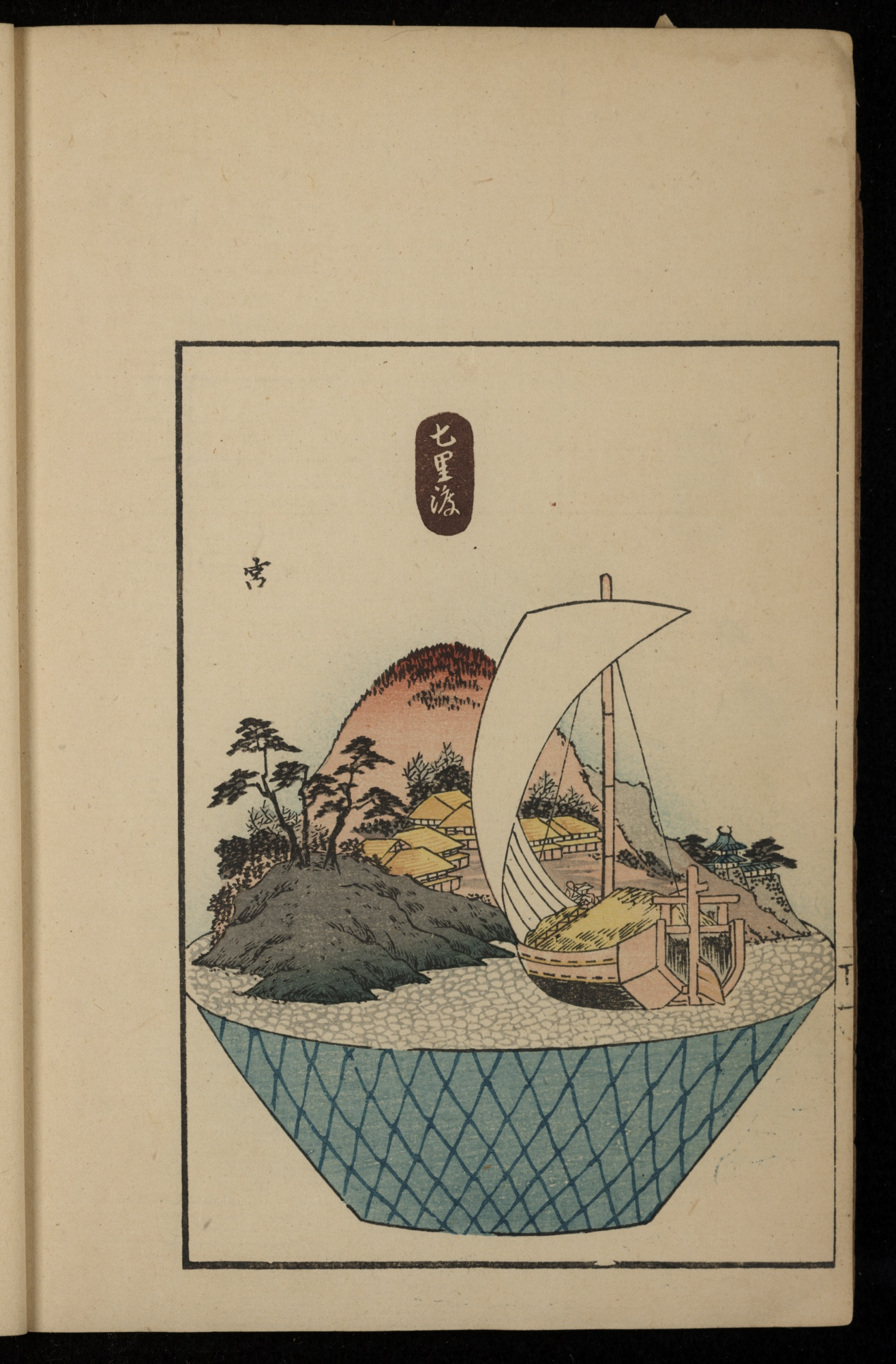
Color print depicting a bonkei modeled after The Fifty-three Stations of the Tōkaidō, print B-42

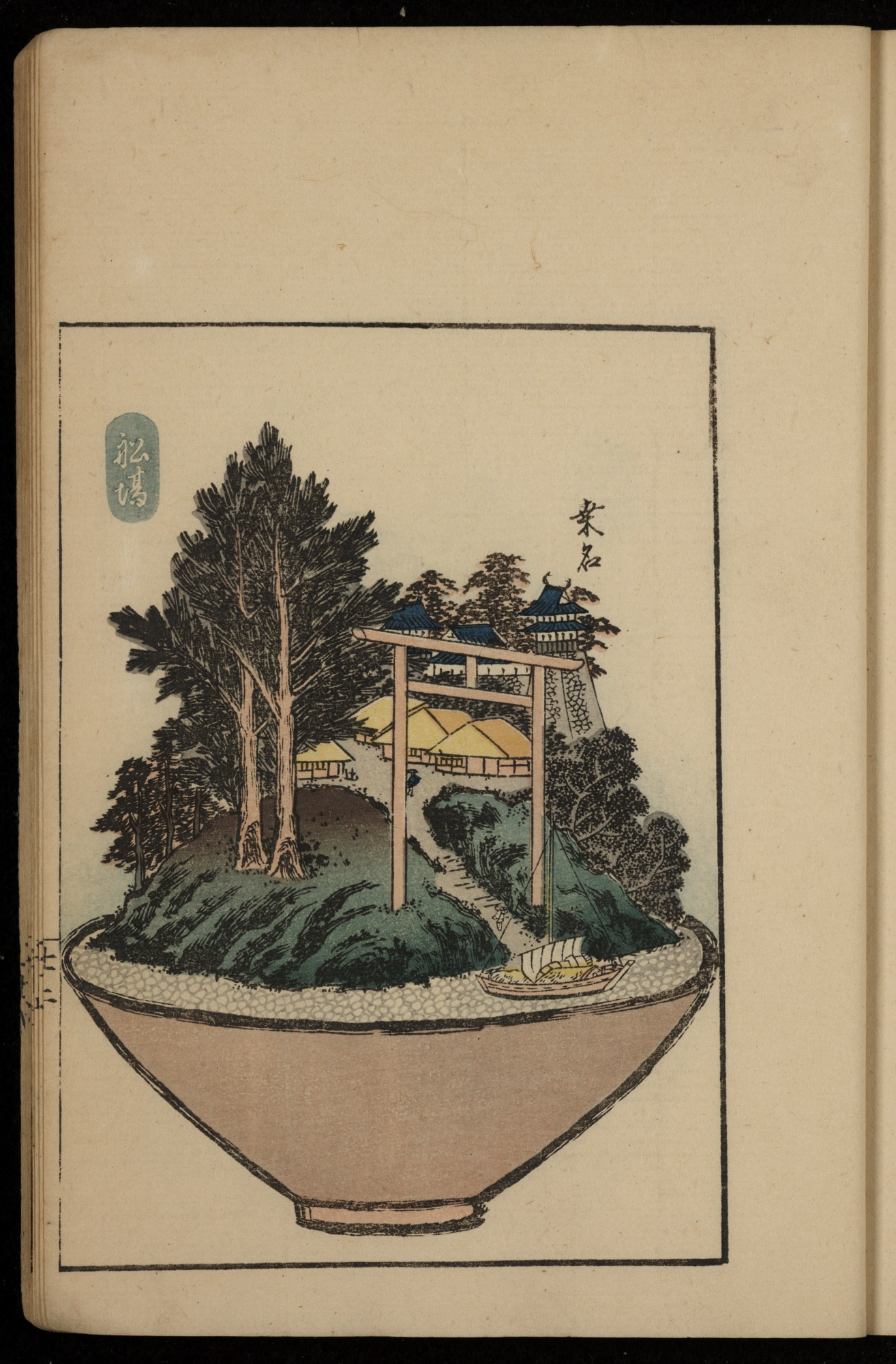
Color print depicting a bonkei modeled after The Fifty-three Stations of the Tōkaidō, print B-43

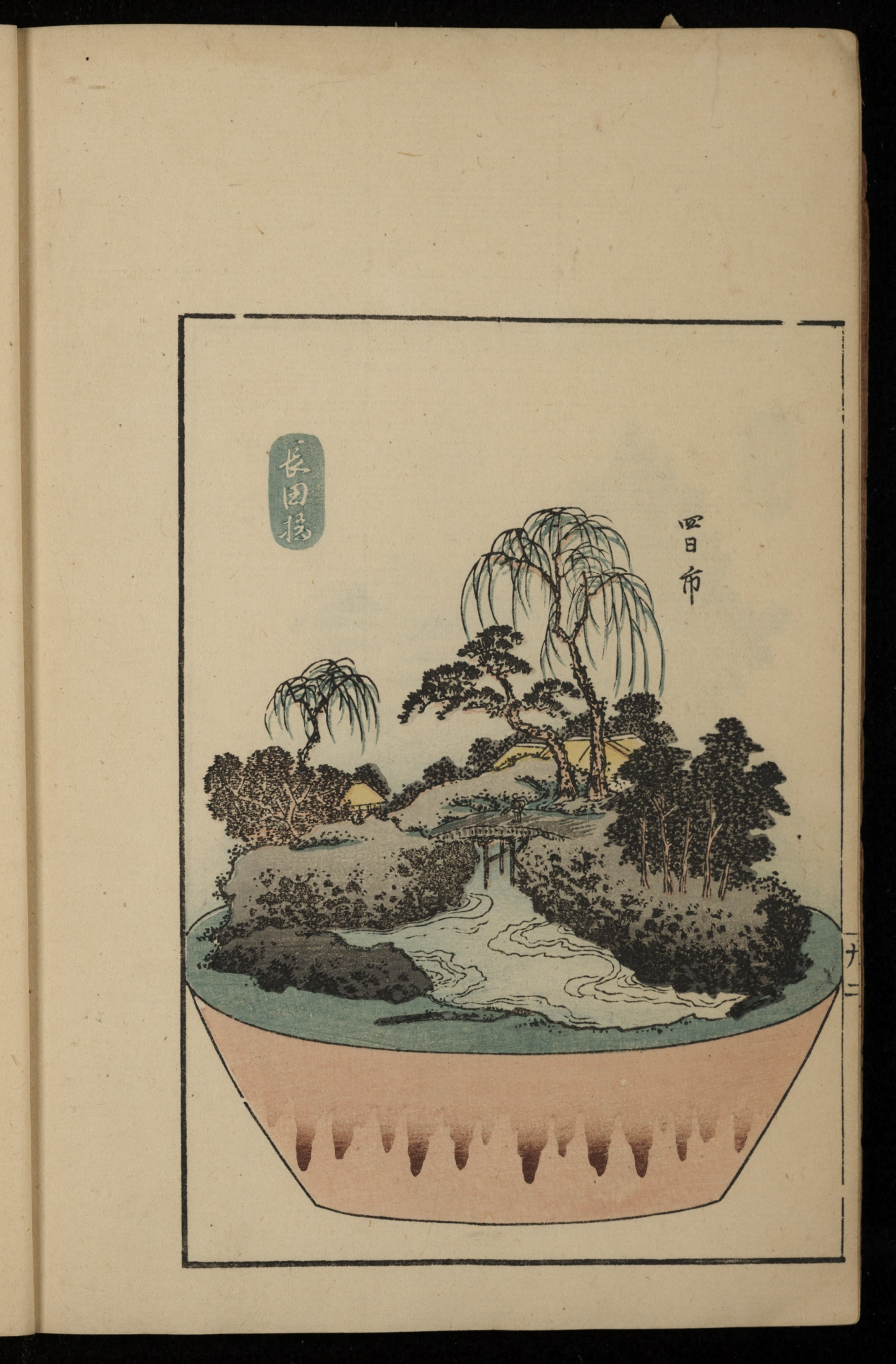
Color print depicting a bonkei modeled after The Fifty-three Stations of the Tōkaidō, print B-44

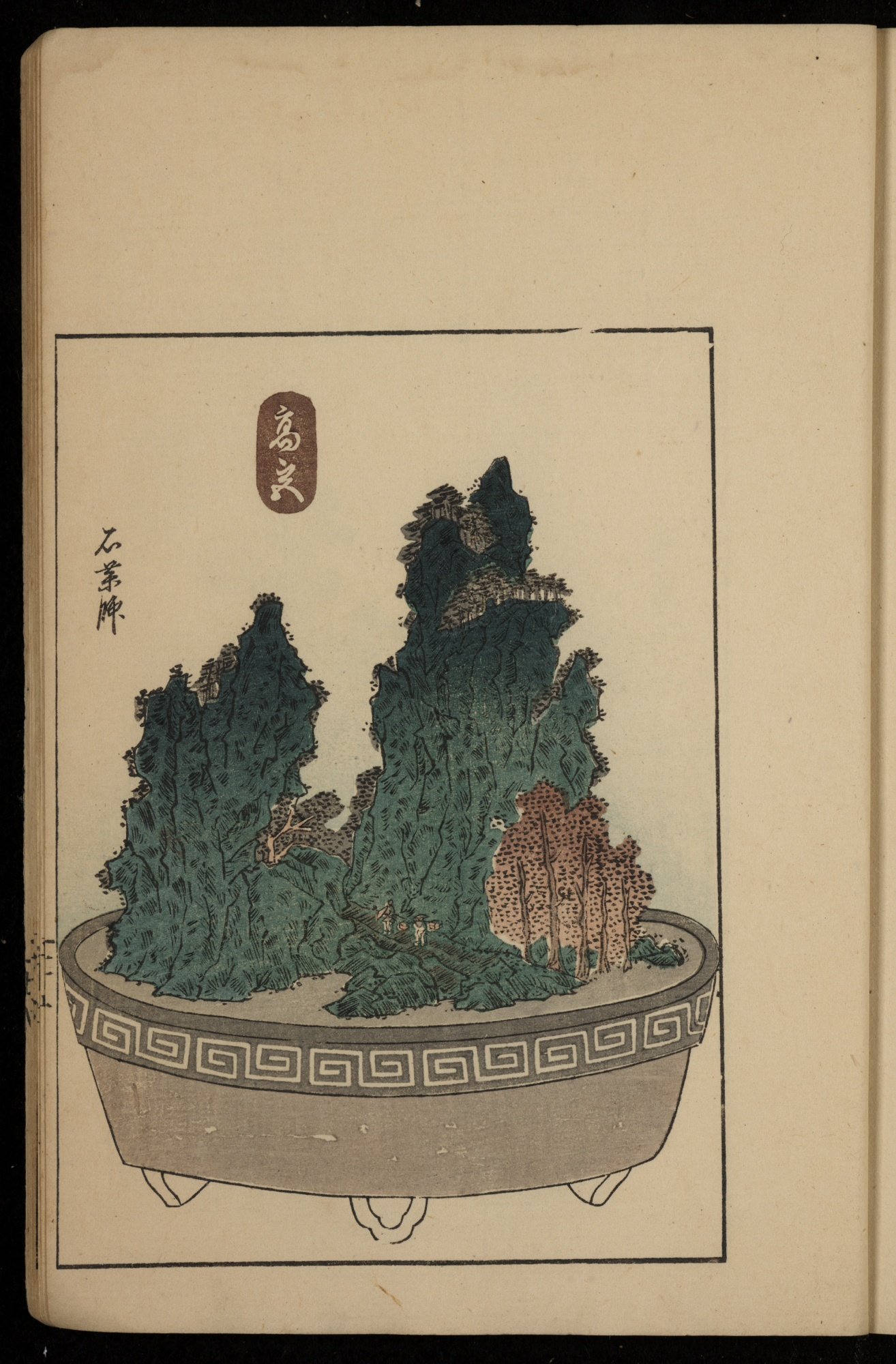
Color print depicting a bonkei modeled after The Fifty-three Stations of the Tōkaidō, print B-45

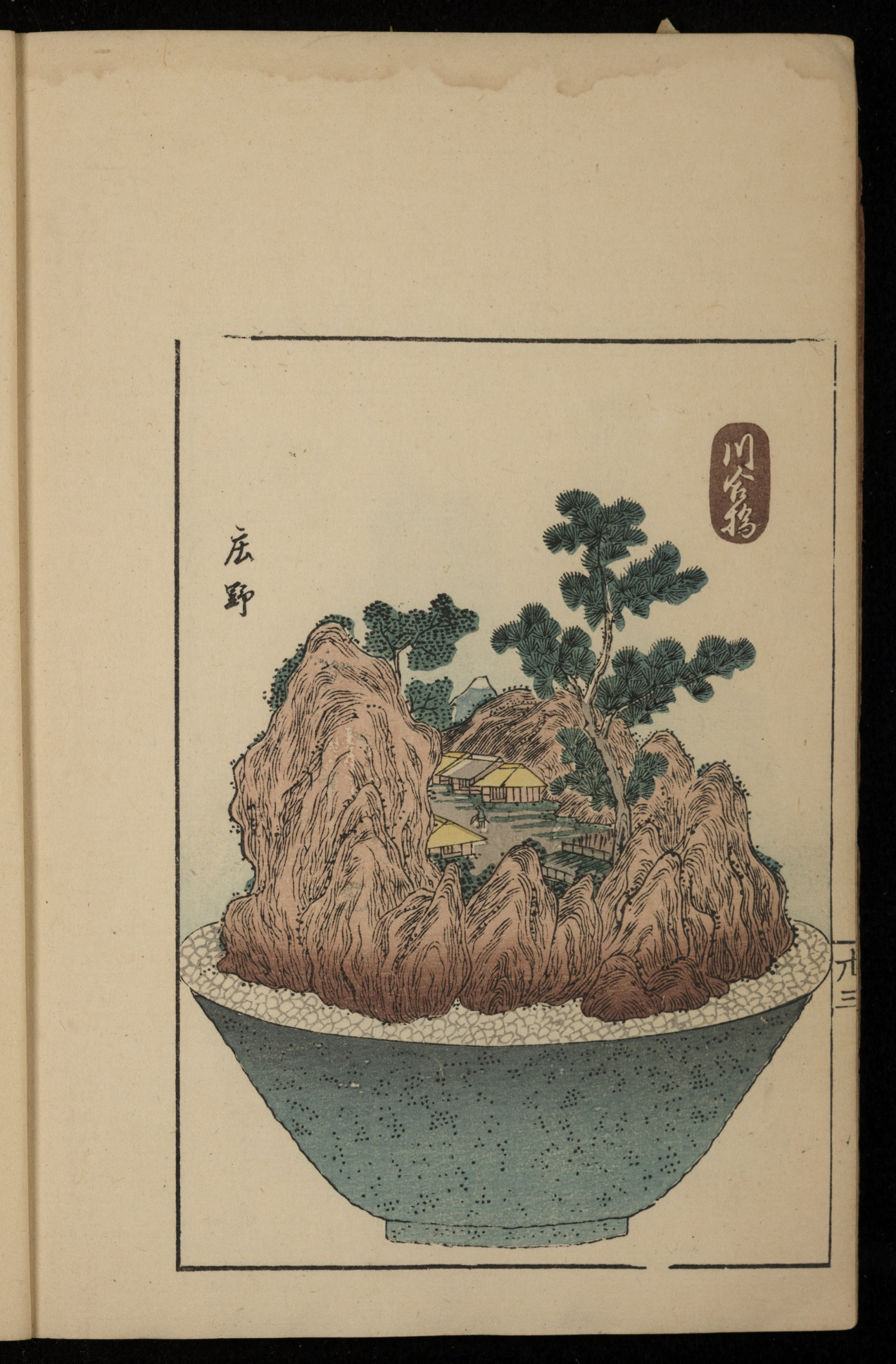
Color print depicting a bonkei modeled after The Fifty-three Stations of the Tōkaidō, print B-46

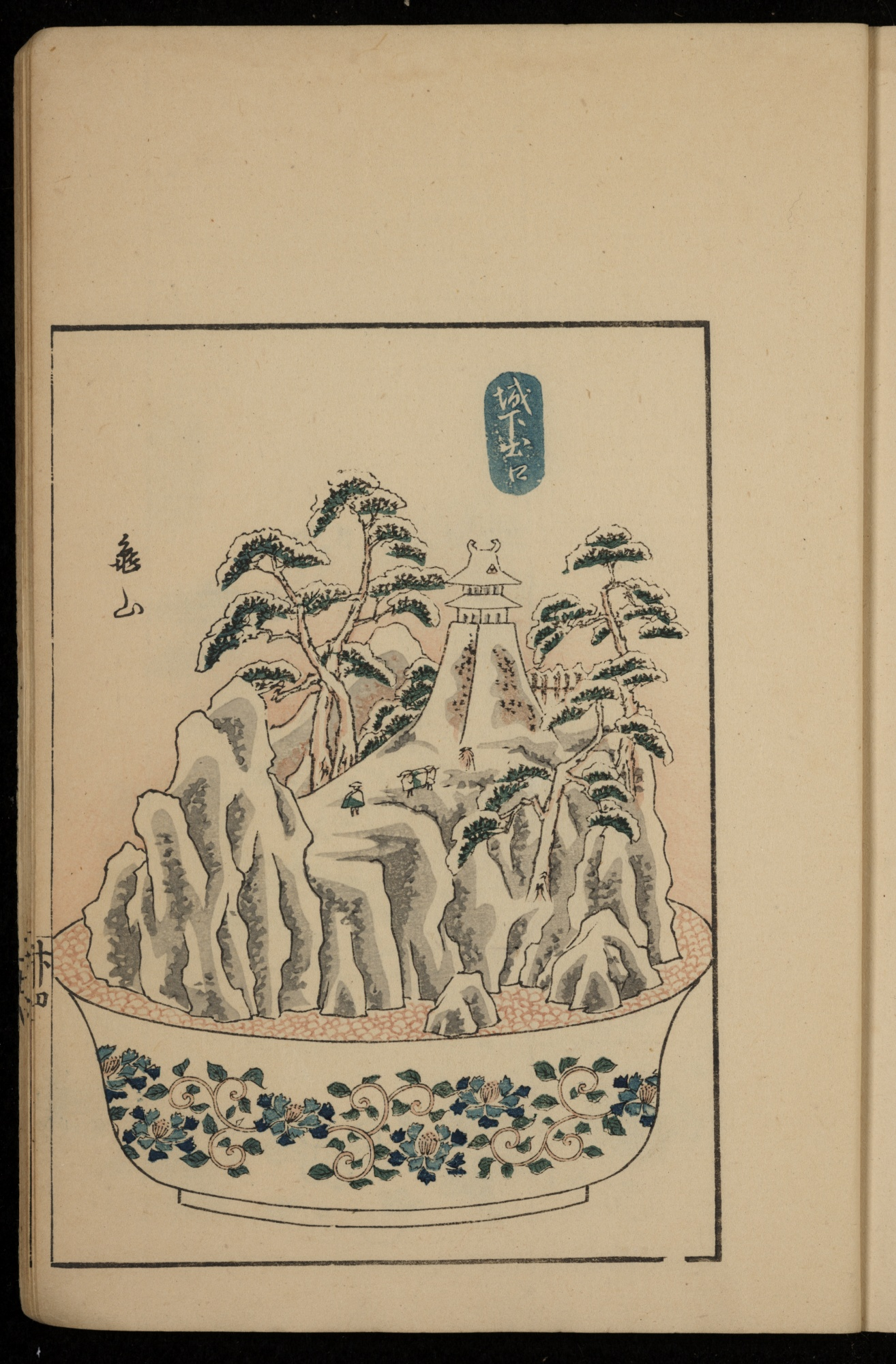
Color print depicting a bonkei modeled after The Fifty-three Stations of the Tōkaidō, print B-47

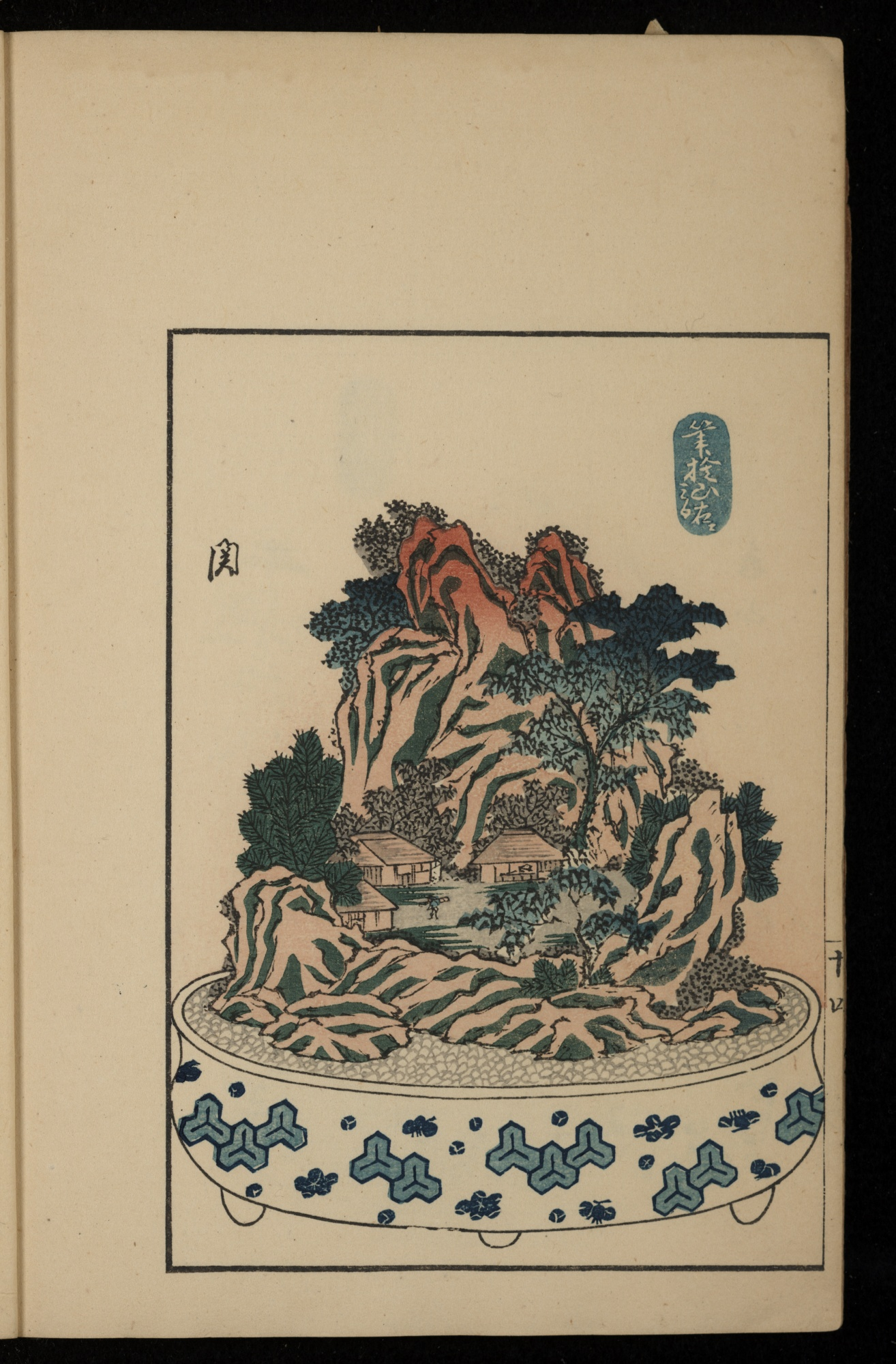
Color print depicting a bonkei modeled after The Fifty-three Stations of the Tōkaidō, print B-48

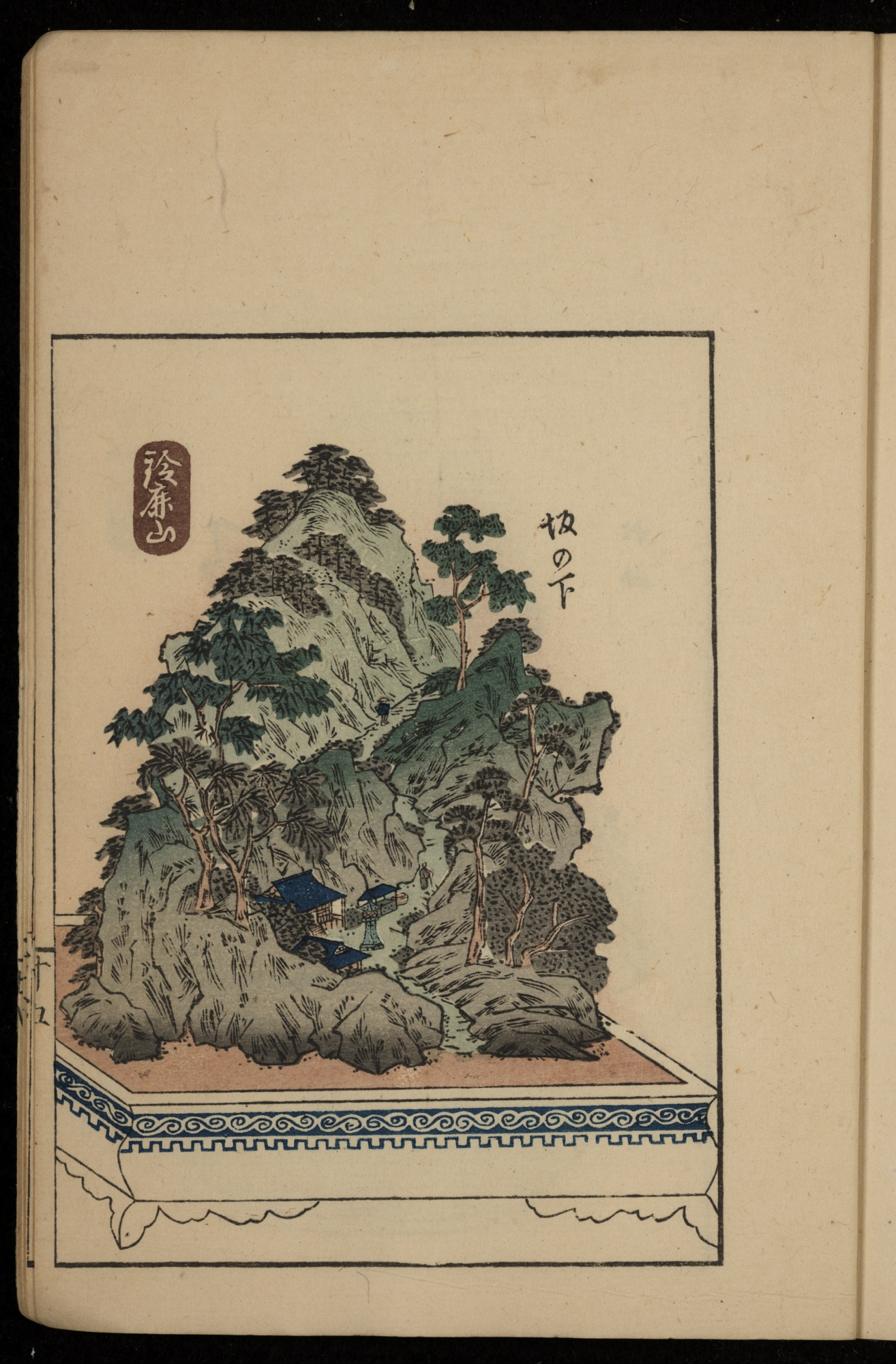
Color print depicting a bonkei modeled after The Fifty-three Stations of the Tōkaidō, print B-49

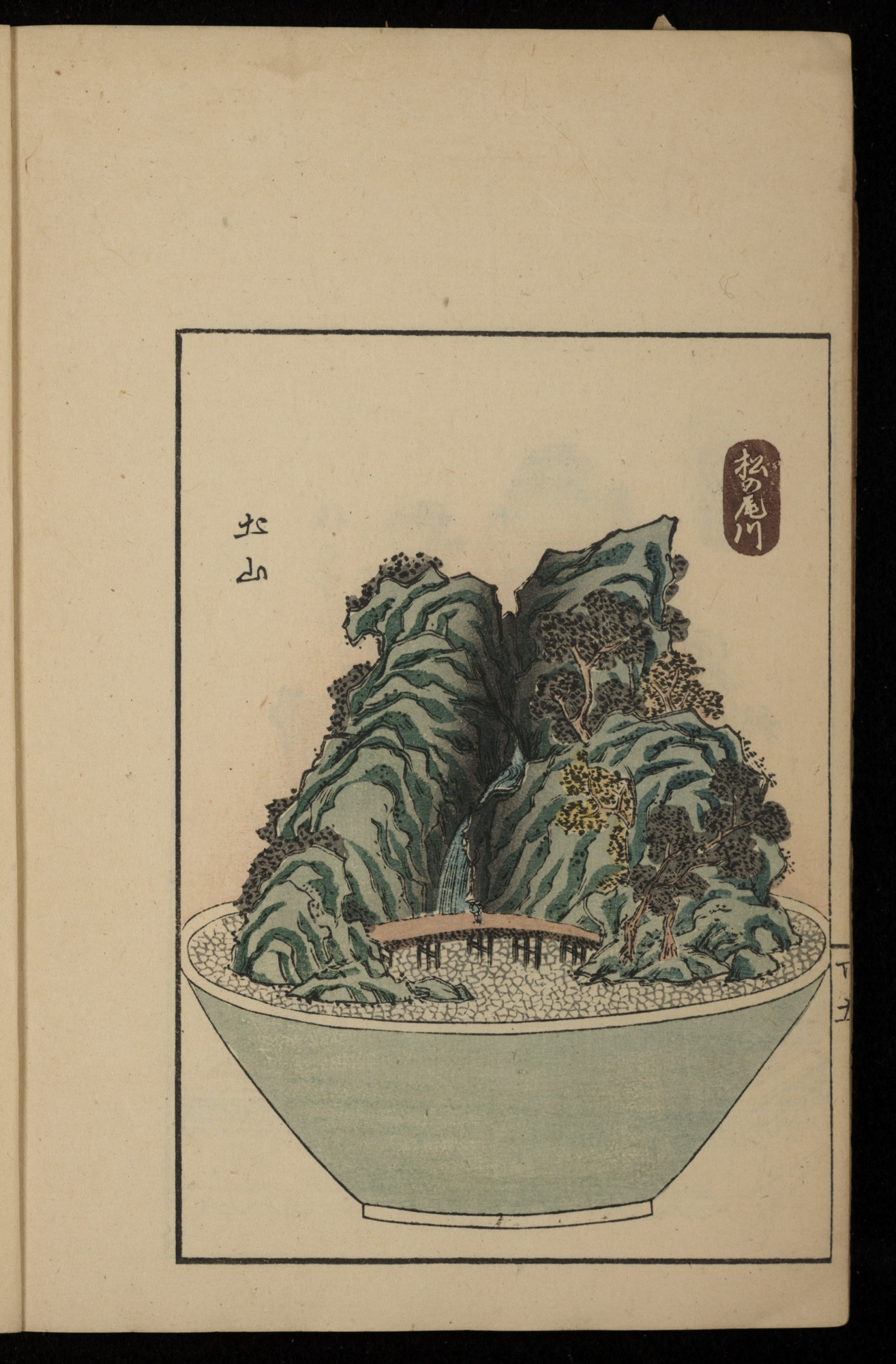
Color print depicting a bonkei modeled after The Fifty-three Stations of the Tōkaidō, print B-50

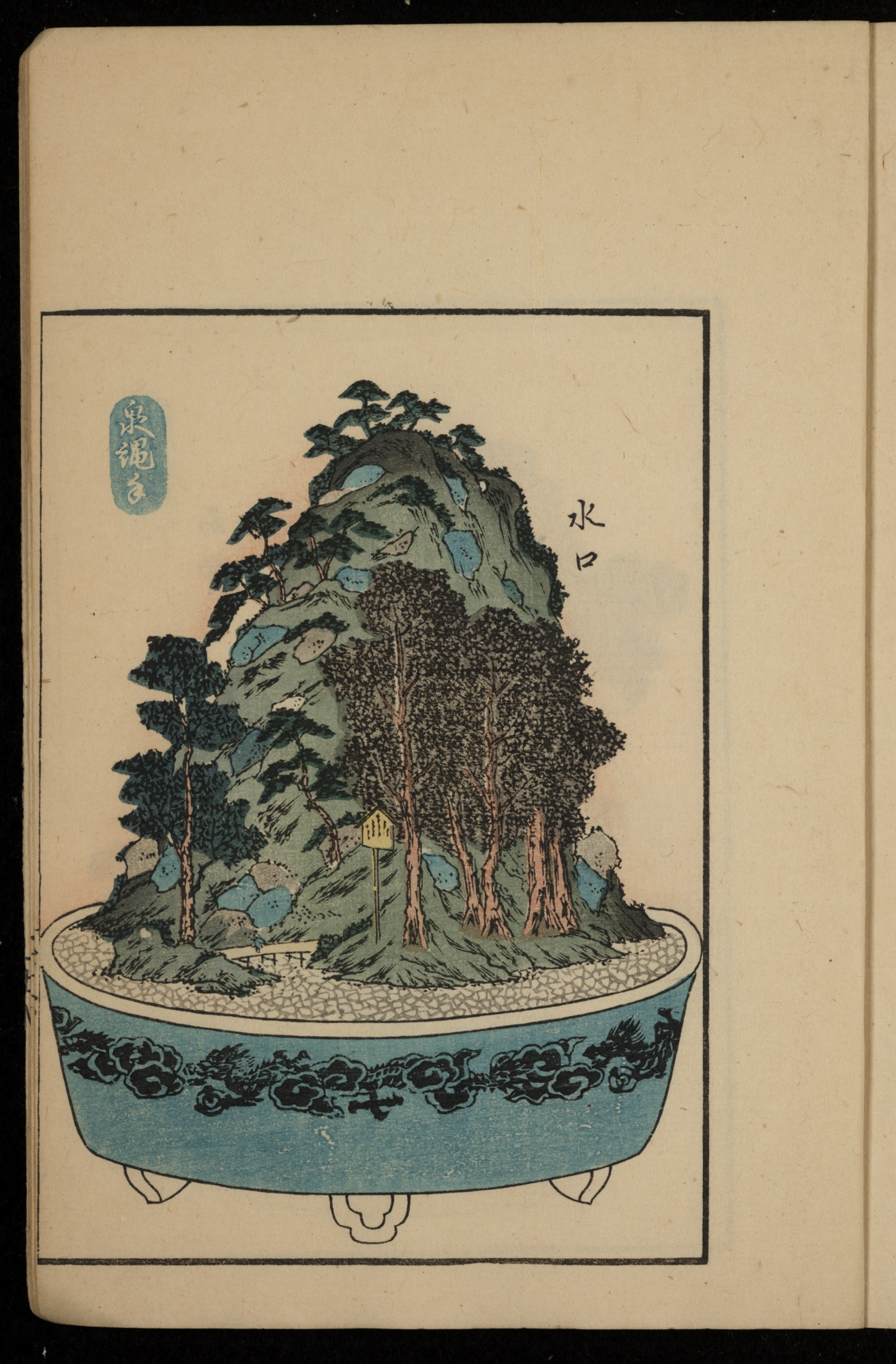
Color print depicting a bonkei modeled after The Fifty-three Stations of the Tōkaidō, print B-51

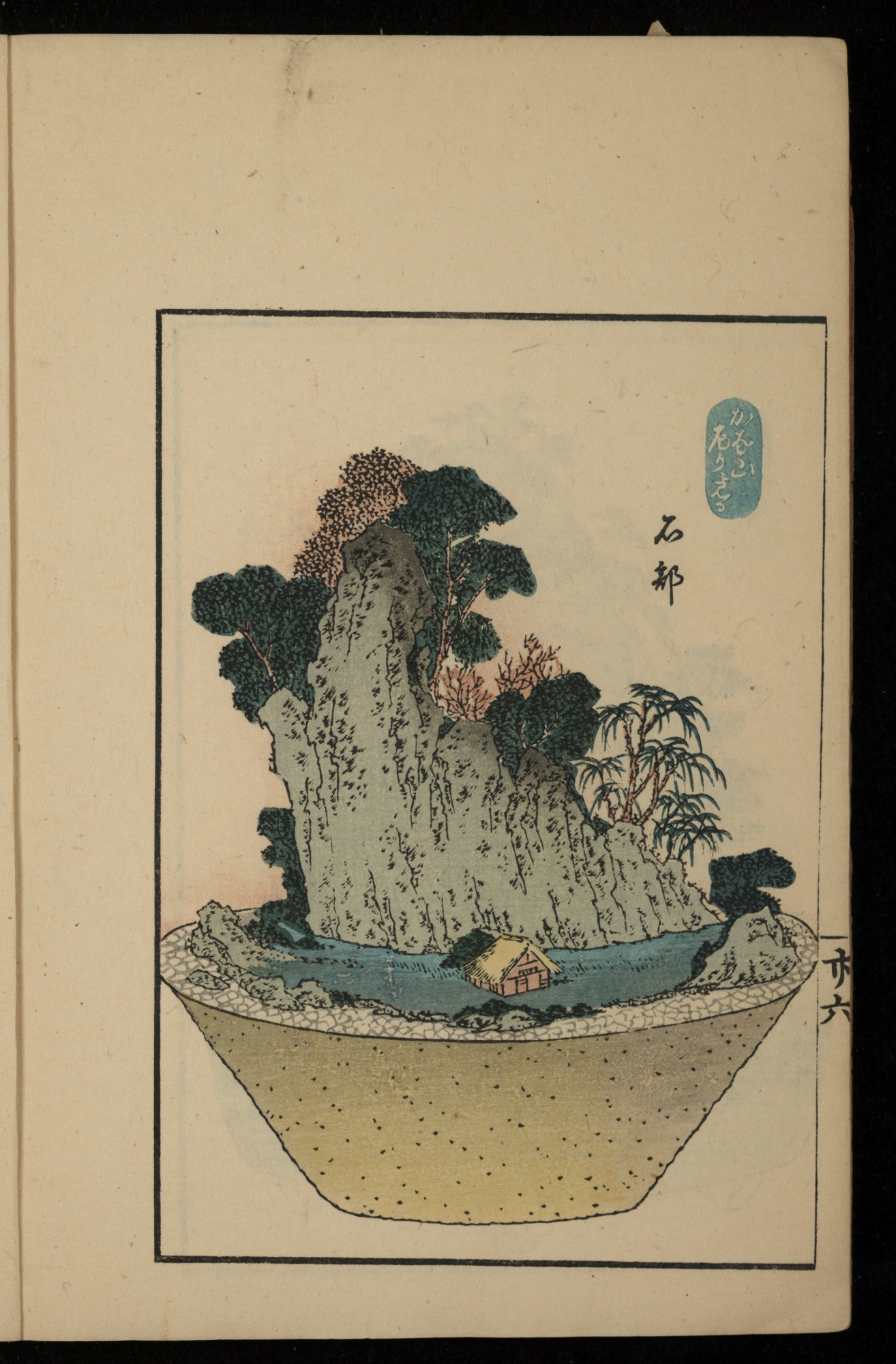
Color print depicting a bonkei modeled after The Fifty-three Stations of the Tōkaidō, print B-52

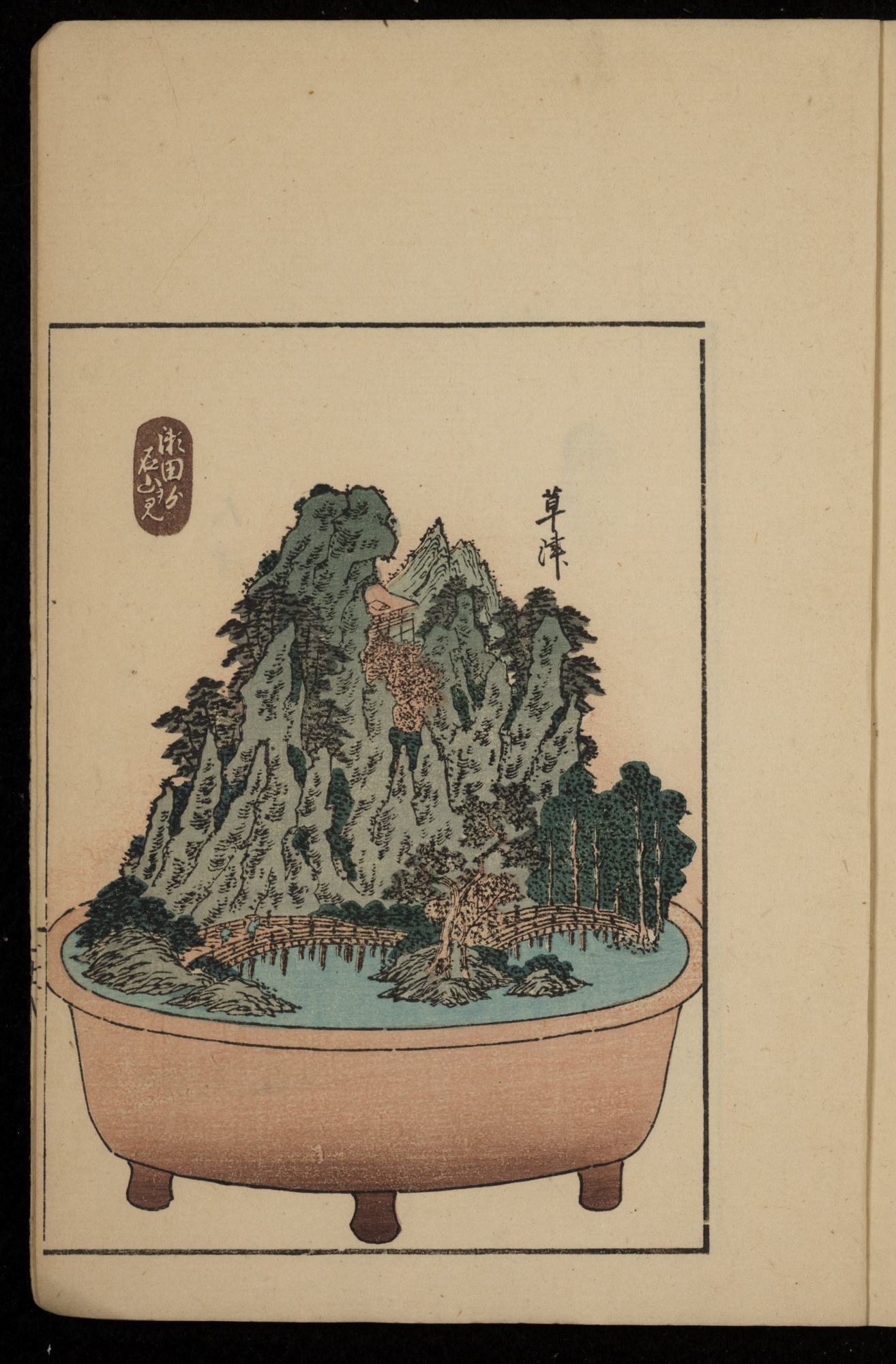
Color print depicting a bonkei modeled after The Fifty-three Stations of the Tōkaidō, print B-53

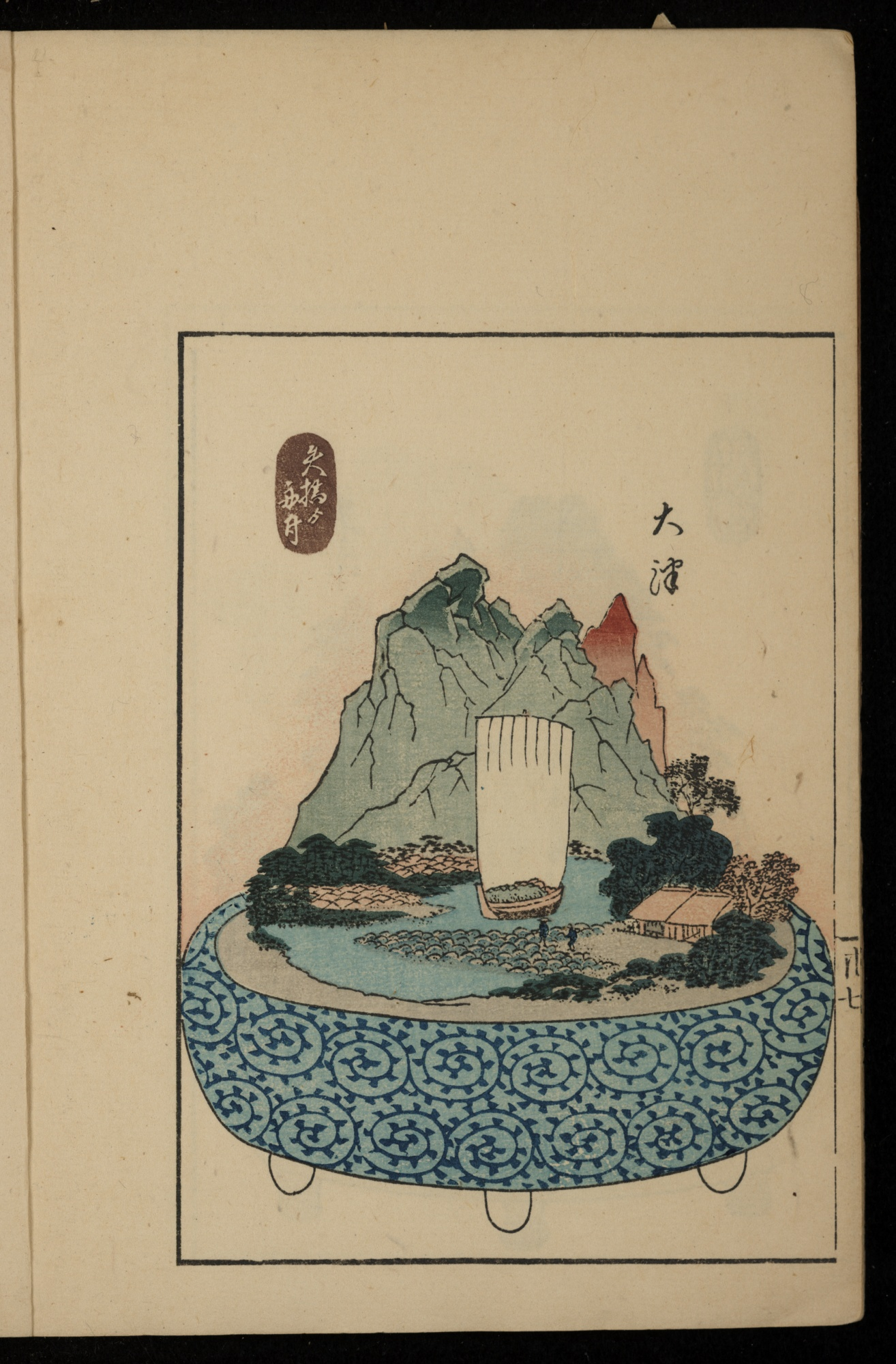
Color print depicting a bonkei modeled after The Fifty-three Stations of the Tōkaidō, print B-54

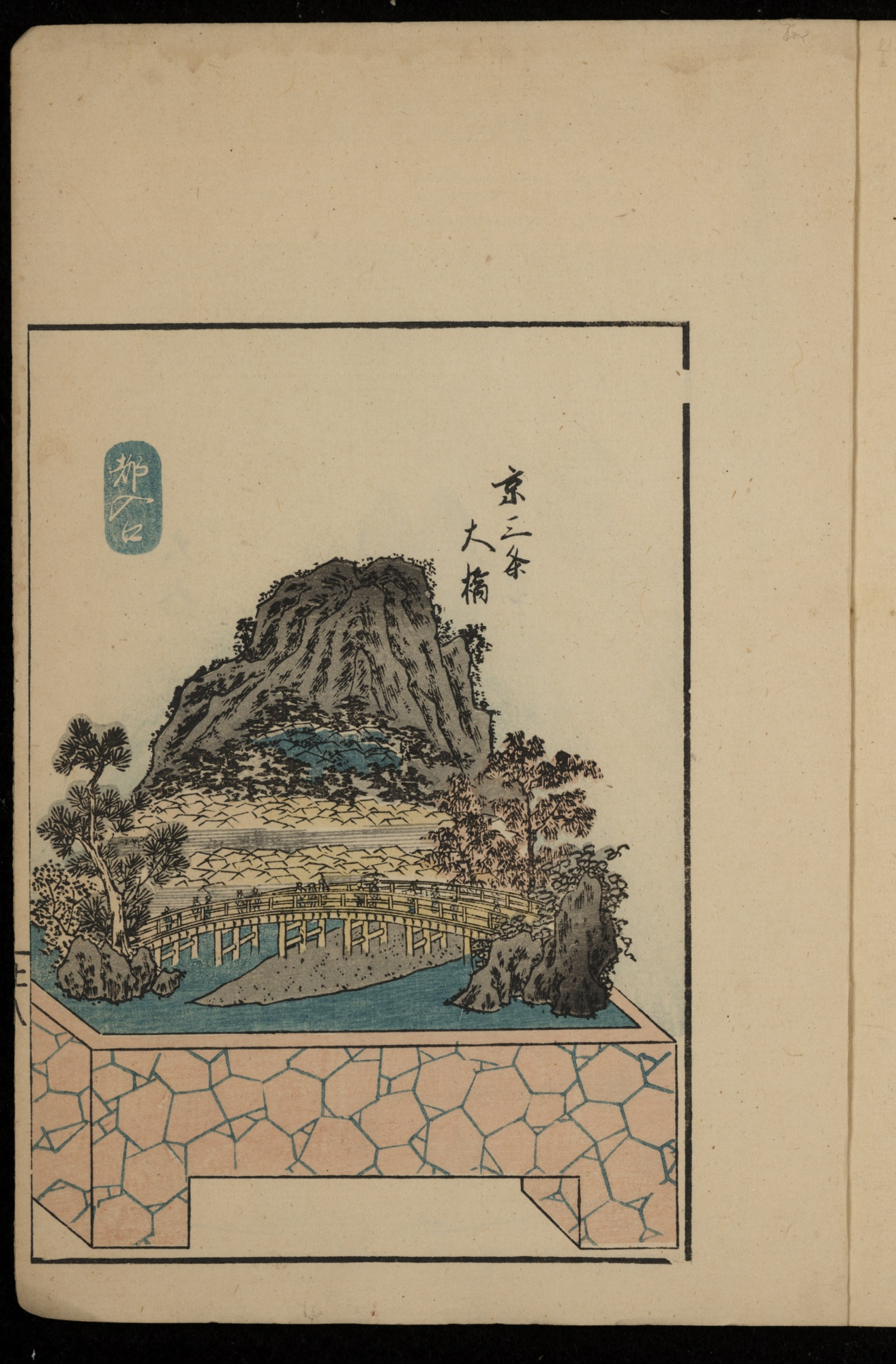
Color print depicting a bonkei modeled after The Fifty-three Stations of the Tōkaidō, print B-55

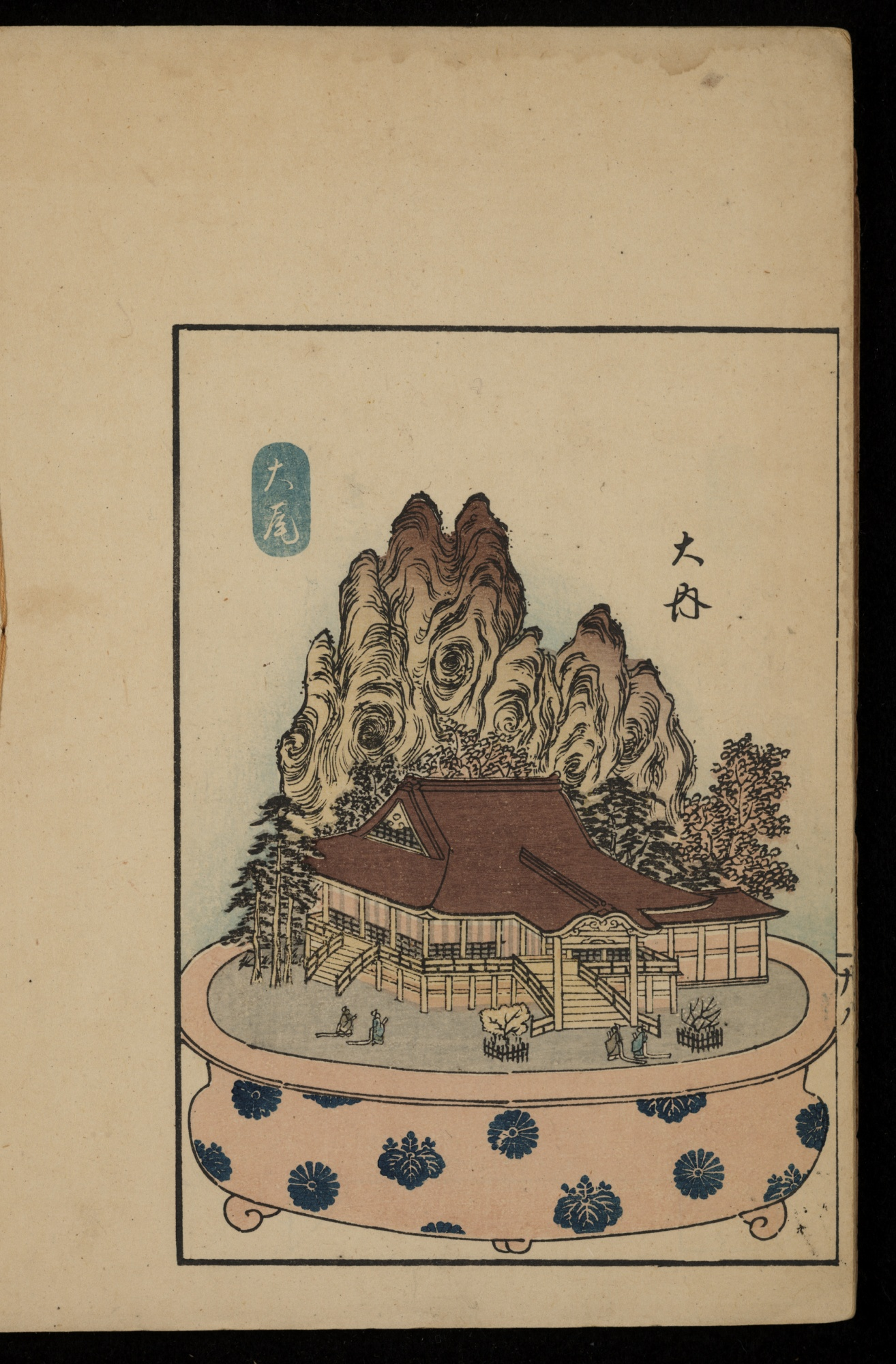
Color print depicting a bonkei modeled after The Fifty-three Stations of the Tōkaidō, print B-56
