= History of bonsai =

History of the art of bonsai

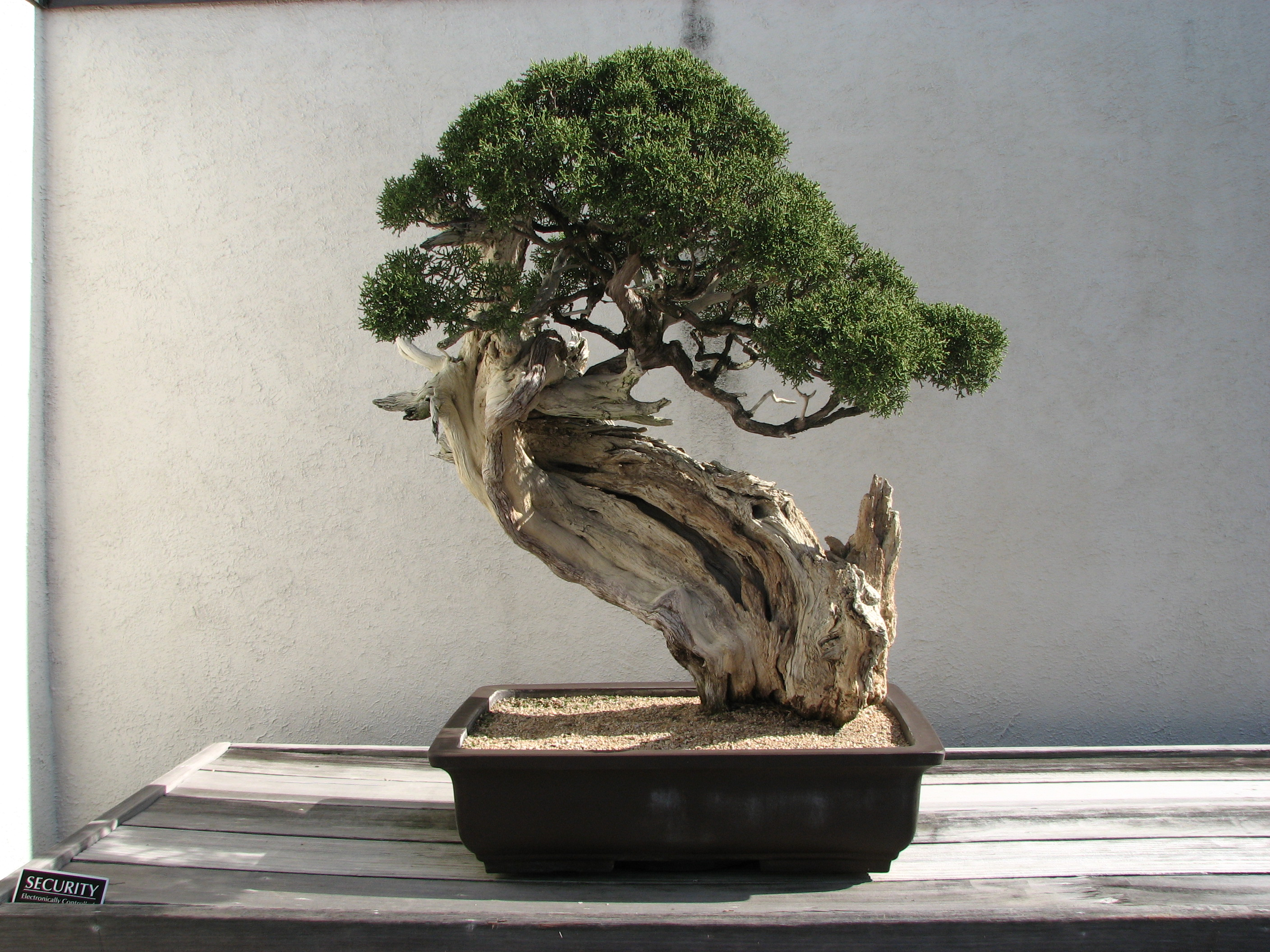
Bonsai from the National Bonsai & Penjing Museum at the United States National Arboretum.

Bonsai (盆栽; "tray planting") is a Japanese art form using trees grown in containers. Similar practices exist in other cultures, including the Chinese tradition of penjing from which the art originated, and the miniature living landscapes of Vietnamese hòn non bộ. The term "bonsai" itself is a Japanese pronunciation of the earlier Chinese term penzai. The word bonsai is often used in English as an umbrella term for all miniature trees in containers or pots.

== History ==
=== Early versions ===
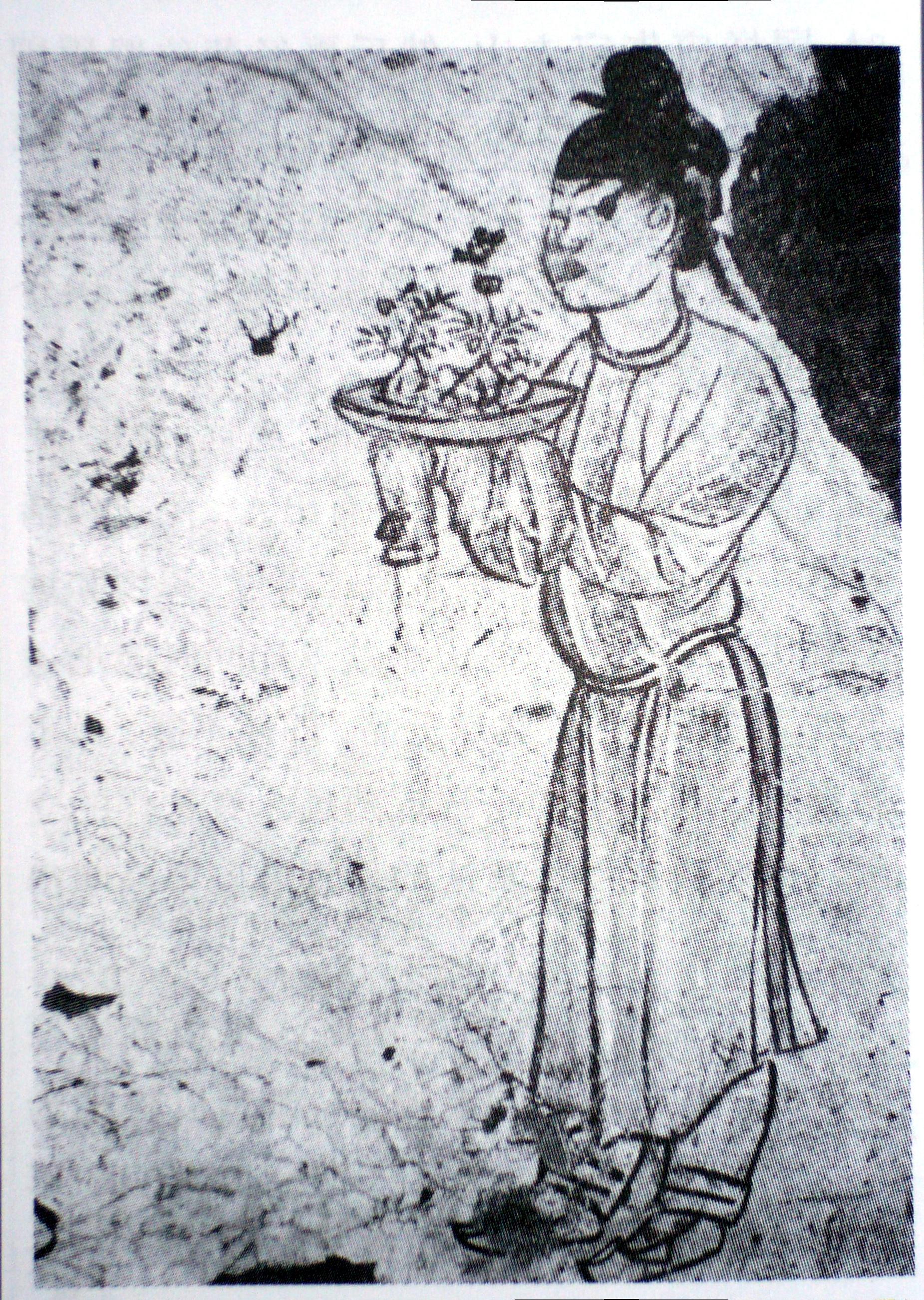
The earliest illustration of a penjing is found in the Qianling Mausoleum murals at the Tang-dynasty tomb of Crown Prince Zhanghuai, dating to 706.

The Japanese art of bonsai originated from the Chinese practice of penjing. From the 6th century onwards, Imperial embassy personnel and Buddhist students from Japan visited and returned from mainland China, bringing back souvenirs, including container plantings. At least 17 diplomatic missions were sent from Japan to the Tang court between the years 603 and 839.

Japan's historical Shōsōin, which houses 7th, 8th, and 9th-century artifacts, including material from Japan's Tenpyō period, contains an elaborate miniature tree display dating from this time.

From about the year 970 comes the first lengthy work of fiction in Japanese, Utsubo Monogatari (The Tale of the Hollow Tree), which includes this passage: "A tree that is left growing in its natural state is a crude thing. It is only when it is kept close to human beings who fashion it with loving care that its shape and style acquire the ability to move one." The idea, therefore, was already established by this time that natural beauty becomes true beauty only when modified in accordance with a human ideal.

In the medieval period, recognizable bonsai began to appear in handscroll paintings like the Ippen shonin eden (1299). Saigyo Monogatari Emaki was the earliest known scroll to depict dwarfed potted trees in Japan. It dates from the year 1195, in the Kamakura period. Wooden tray and dish-like pots with dwarf landscapes on modern-looking wooden shelf/benches are shown in the 1309 Kasuga-gongen-genki scroll. These novelties show off the owner's wealth and were probably exotics imported from China.

Chinese Chan Buddhist monks also came over to teach at Japan's monasteries, and one of the monks' activities was to introduce political leaders of the day to the various arts of miniature landscapes as ideal accomplishments for men of taste and learning.

The c. 1300 rhymed prose essay, Bonseki no Fu (Tribute to Bonseki), written by celebrated priest and master of Chinese poetry, Kokan Shiren (1278–1346), outlined the aesthetic principles for what would be termed bonsai, bonseki, and garden architecture itself. At first, the Japanese used miniaturized trees grown in containers to decorate their homes and gardens.

Criticism of the interest in curiously twisted specimens of potted plants shows up in one chapter of the 243-chapter compilation Tsurezuregusa (c. 1331). This work would become a sacred teaching handed down from master to student, through a limited chain of poets (some famous), until it was at last widely published in the early 17th century. Before then, the criticism had only a modest influence on dwarf potted tree cultures.

In 1351, dwarf trees displayed on short poles were portrayed in the Boki Ekotoba scroll. Several other scrolls and paintings also included depictions of these kinds of trees. Potted landscape arrangements made during the next hundred years or so included figurines after the Chinese fashion in order to add scale and theme. These miniatures would eventually be considered garnishes, decidedly to be excluded by Japanese artists who were simplifying their creations in the spirit of Zen Buddhism.

=== Hachi-no-ki ===
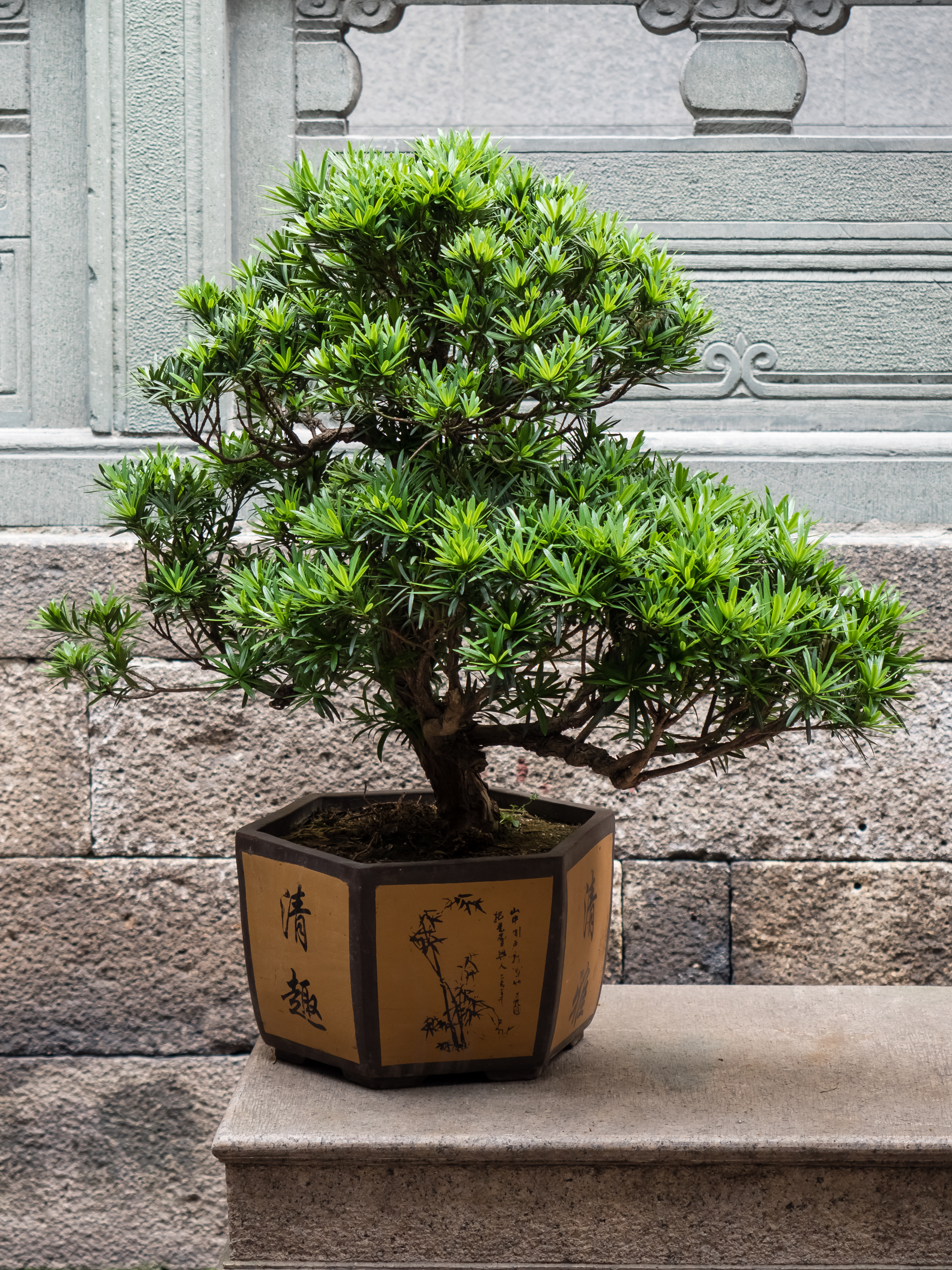
Penjing specimen with decorated and relatively deep pot ("bowl")

Around the 14th century, the term for dwarf potted trees was "the bowl's tree" (鉢の木 hachi no ki). This denoted the use of a fairly deep pot, as opposed to the shallow pot denoted by the term bonsai.

Hachi no Ki (The Potted Trees) is also the title of a Noh play by Zeami Motokiyo (1363–1444), based on a story from c. 1383. It tells of an impoverished samurai who sacrifices his three last dwarf potted trees as firewood to provide warmth for a traveling monk on a winter night. The monk is an official in disguise who later rewards the samurai by giving him three lands whose names include the names of the three types of trees the samurai burnt: ume (plum), matsu (pine), and sakura (cherry). In later centuries, woodblock prints by several artists would depict this popular drama. There was even a fabric design of the same name.

Stories referring to bonsai began to appear more frequently by the 17th century. Shōgun Tokugawa Iemitsu (r. 1623–1651) was a hachi no ki enthusiast. A story tells of Okubo Hikozemon (1560–1639), councilor to the shōgun, who threw one of Iemitsu's favorite trees away in the garden—in sight of the shōgun—in order to dissuade him from spending so much time and attention on these trees. In spite of the servant's efforts, Iemitsu never gave up his beloved art form. Another story from this time tells of a samurai's gardener who killed himself when his master insulted a hachi no ki of which the artisan was especially proud.

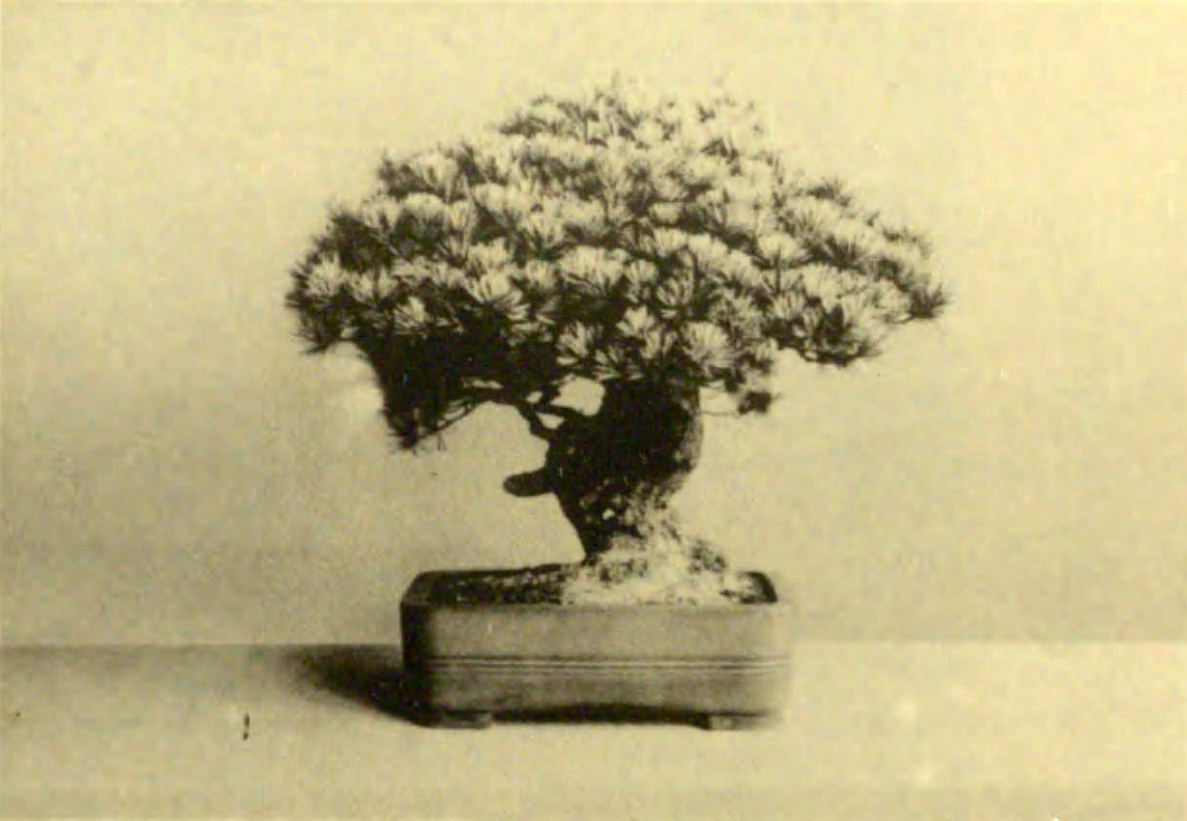
Japanese white pine, "Sandai Shōgun" (The Third Shogun), approximately 550 years old, Imperial Collection, 1938.

Bonsai dating to the 17th century have survived to the present. One of the oldest-known living bonsai trees, considered one of the National Treasures of Japan, is in the Tokyo Imperial Palace collection. A five-needle pine (Pinus pentaphylla var. negishi) known as Sandai Shogun (三代将軍, the third shogun) is documented as having been cared for by Tokugawa Iemitsu. The tree is thought to be at least 500 years old and was first trained as a bonsai by, at latest, the year 1610. The earliest known report by a Westerner of a Japanese dwarf potted tree was made in 1692 by George Meister.

Chinese bonsai containers exported to Japan during the 17th and 18th centuries would become referred to as kowatari (古渡 "old crossing"). These were made between 1465 and about 1800. Many came from Yixing in Jiangsu province—unglazed and usually purplish-brown—and some others from around Canton, in particular, during the Ming dynasty. Miniature potted trees were called hachi-ue in a 1681 horticulture book. This book also stated that everyone at the time grew azaleas, even if the poorest people had to use an abalone shell as a container. Torii Kiyoharu's use of woodblock printing in Japan depicted the dwarf potted trees from horticultural expert Itō Ihei's nursery.

By the end of the 18th century, bonsai cultivation was quite widespread and had begun to interest the public. In the Tenmei era (1781–88), an exhibit of traditional dwarf potted pines began to be held every year in Kyoto. Connoisseurs from five provinces and neighboring areas would bring one or two plants each to the show in order to submit them to visitors for ranking.

=== Classical period ===
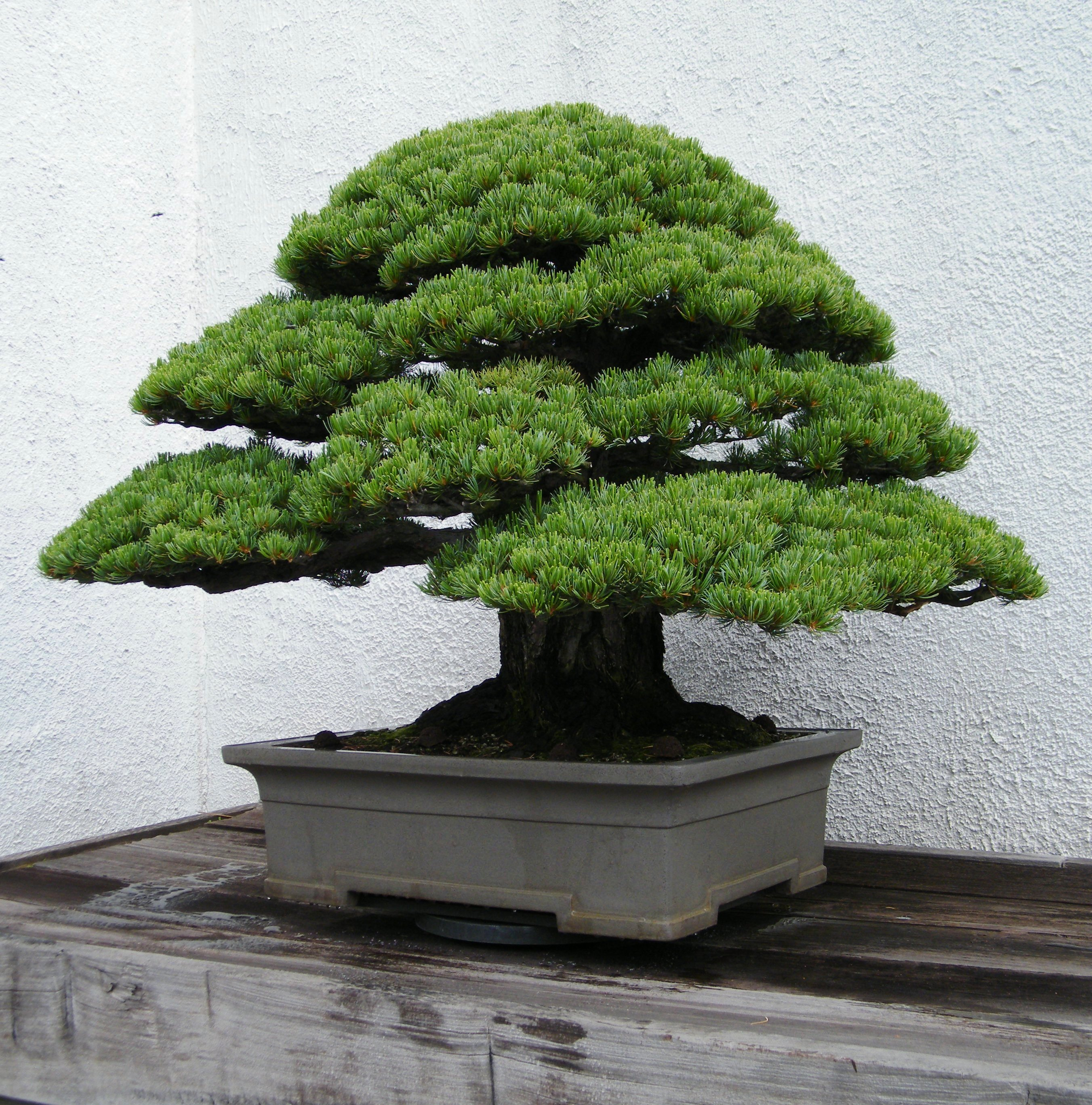
White pine bonsai cultivated from 1855 (National Bonsai & Penjing Museum)

In Itami, Hyōgo (near Osaka), a group of scholars of Chinese arts gathered in the early 19th century to discuss recent styles in the art of miniature trees. Their version of these, which had been previously called "hachiue" or other terms, were renamed "bonsai" (the Japanese pronunciation of the Chinese term penzai). This term had the connotation of a shallower container in which the Japanese could now more successfully style small trees. The term "bonsai", however, would not become regularly used in describing their dwarf potted trees for nearly a century. Many others terms and compositions adopted by this group were derived from Kai-shi-en Gaden, the Japanese version of Jieziyuan Huazhuan (Manual of the Mustard Seed Garden).

In 1829, a significant book that first established classical bonsai art, Sōmoku Kin'yō-shū (草木錦葉集, A Colorful Collection of Trees and Plants/Collection of tree leaves), was published. It includes the basic criteria for the ideal form of the classical pine bonsai, in detail and with illustrations. That same year, small tako-tsuki (octopus-styled) trees with long, wavy-branches began to be offered by a grower in Asakusa Park, a north-eastern Edo suburb. Within 20, years that neighborhood became crowded with nurseries selling bonsai. The three-volume Kinsei-Jufu, possibly the first book of bonsai, tools, and pots, dates from 1833.

Numerous artists of the 19th century depicted dwarf potted trees in woodblock prints, including Yoshishige (who pictured each of the fifty-three classic stations of the Tōkaidō as a miniature landscape) and Kunisada (who included mostly hachi-no-ki in some four dozen prints). The earliest known photograph from Japan depicting a dwarf potted tree dates from c. 1861 by Pierre Rossier.

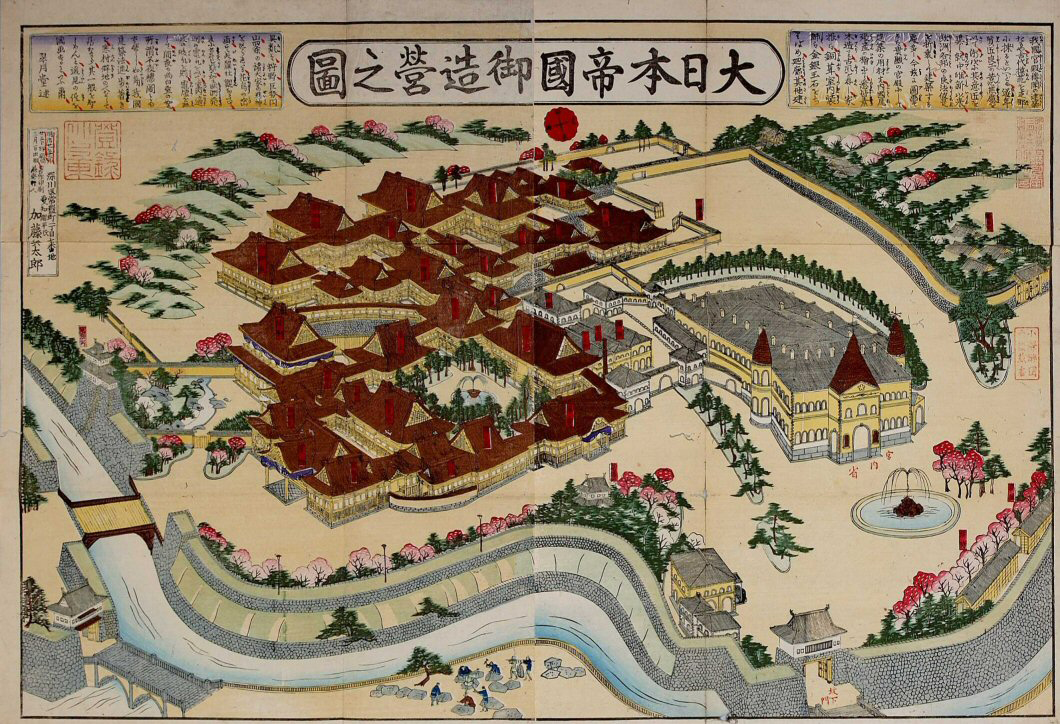
Meiji Palace in Tokyo

On October 13, 1868, the Meiji Emperor moved to his new capital in Tokyo. Bonsai were displayed both inside and outside Meiji Palace, where they have since remained important in affairs of the Palace. Bonsai placed in the grand setting of the Imperial Palace had to be "Giant Bonsai," large enough to fill the grand space. The Meiji Emperor encouraged interest in bonsai. Government officials who did not appreciate bonsai fell out of favor. Soon, all members of the ministry had bonsai whether they liked the tradition or not. Prince Itoh was an exception: Any bonsai that the emperor gave him were then passed to Kijoji Itoh. Kijoji Itoh was a statesman of great influence behind the scenes, and a noted bonsai collector who conducted research and experiments on these bonsai.

Bonsai shaping aesthetics and techniques were becoming more sophisticated. By the late 1860s, thick combed and wetted hemp fibers were used to roughly shape the trunk and branches of miniature trees by pulling and tying them. The process was tedious and bothersome, and the final product was unsightly. Tips of branches would only be opened flat. Long, wavy-branched tako (octopus)-style trees were mass-produced and designed in the [renamed capital] Tokyo for the increasing foreign trade, while the more subtle and delicate bunjin-style trees designed in Kyoto and Osaka were for use in Japan. Tokyo preferred big trunks out of proportion and did not approve of Kyoto's finely designed slender trunks. (This cultural rivalry would continue for a century.)

Pots exported from China between 1816 and 1911 (especially the late 19th century) were called nakawatari or chūwatari (both meaning "middle-crossing"), shallow rectangular or oval stoneware with carved feet and drainage holes. Unglazed pots of this type were used at ancestral shrines and treasured by the Chinese. After the mid-century, certain Japanese antiquities dealers imported them and instant popular approval for this type of container for bonsai created a huge demand. As a consequence, orders came from Japan to Yixing pottery centers specifically to make bonsai pots.

Through the later 19th century, Japanese participation in various international exhibitions introduced many in the U.S. and Europe to dwarf potted trees. Specimens from the displays went into Western hands following the closing of the fairs. Japanese immigrants to the U.S. West Coast and Hawaii Territory brought plants and cultivation experience with them. Export nurseries, the most notable one being the Yokohama Gardeners Association, provided increasingly good quality dwarf potted trees for Americans and Europeans—even if the buyers did not have enough information or experience to actually keep the trees alive long-term.

An Artistic Bonsai Concours was held in Tokyo in 1892, followed by the publication of a three-volume commemorative picture book. This demonstrated a new tendency to see bonsai as an independent art form. In 1903, the Tokyo association Jurakukai held showings of bonsai and ikebana at two Japanese-style restaurants. Three years later, Bonsai Gaho (1906 to c. 1913), became the first monthly magazine on the subject. It was followed by Toyo Engei and Hana in 1907, and Bonsai in 1921.

By 1907, "on the outskirts of Tokio [dwarf] tree artists have formed a little colony of from twenty to thirty houses, and from this centre, their work finds its way to all parts of the world." "Its secrets are handed down from father to son in a few families, and are guarded with scrupulous care."

Count Ōkuma (1838–1922) maintained a famed collection of dwarf pines and dwarf plum trees.

In 1910, shaping with wire was described in the Sanyu-en Bonsai-Dan (History of Bonsai in the Sanyu nursery). Zinc-galvanized steel wire was initially used. Expensive copper wire was only used for trees that had real potential. Between 1911 and about 1940, mass-produced containers were exported from Yixing, China, and made to the specifications of Japanese dealers. These were called Shinto (new crossing or arrival) or Shin-watare. These were made for increasing numbers of enthusiasts. Some containers, including primitive style ones, were also being made in Formosa.

By 1914, "at the N.E. corner of Shiba Park is a permanent bazaar (the first of its kind established in Tokyo) where hosts of native-made gimcracks can be bought at fixed prices. The exhibits of potted plants and dwarf trees held here from time to time attract lovers of such things." In the same year, the first national annual bonsai show was held (an event repeated annually through 1933) in Tokyo's Hibiya Park. During this period, the tokonoma in formal rooms and tea rooms became the main place for bonsai display. The shaped trees now shared space with other items such as scrolls, incense burners, Buddhist statues, and tea ceremony implements.

The first issue of Bonsai magazine was published in 1921 by Norio Kobayashi (1889–1972). This influential periodical would run for 518 consecutive issues. Copper wire was being extensively used by this time. Major changes to a tree's shape could now be accomplished with wiring. Trees could be precisely and aesthetically wired, and then sold immediately. A greater number of both collected and nursery trees could now be trained for bonsai. The number of hobbyists increased due to the increased ability to style with wire, but there was also an increase in damaged or scarred trees.

The 1923 Great Kantō earthquake and resulting fire devastated Tokyo, and gutted the downtown area where many bonsai specimens were grown. And so, two years later, a group of thirty families of downtown Tokyo professional growers established the Ōmiya Bonsai Village, northeast of the capital. The first great annual public exhibition of trees was held at the Asahi Newspaper Hall in Tokyo in 1927. The first of the very prestigious Kokufu-ten exhibitions were held in Tokyo's Ueno Park, beginning in 1934. By the following year, tokonoma display principles allowed for bonsai to be shown for the tree's individual beauty, not just for its spiritual or symbolic significance.

Toolsmith Masakuni I (1880–1950) helped design and produce the first steel tools specifically made for the developing requirements of bonsai styling.

By 1940, there were about 300 bonsai dealers in Tokyo, some 150 species of trees were being cultivated, and thousands of specimens annually were shipped to Europe and America. The first major book on the subject in English was published in the Japanese capital: Dwarf Trees (Bonsai) by Shinobu Nozaki (1895–1968). The first bonsai nurseries and clubs in the Americas were started by first and second-generation Japanese immigrants.

The caretaker of the Imperial bonsai collection, Kyūzō Murata (1902–1991), was one of very few persons allowed to take care of bonsai during the Pacific War. He gathered together and preserved many trees from the other Omiya growers and would water them under the protection of night. Throughout 1945, many old trees were the smallest casualties of the spring and summer napalm bombing of Tokyo (especially March 9/10) and sixty-six other cities. Gardeners protected the Imperial collection trees from fire by pouring water over them after the Palace caught fire when neighboring areas were bombed on May 25/26. Following the surrender of Japan, there began the post-war re-evaluation and reviving of damaged collections of trees—including the Imperial—which would continue for over a decade as Japan was rebuilt. Many of the Omiya growers did not continue their vocation.

During the Allied Occupation of Japan (through 1952), U.S. officers and their wives could take courses in bonsai, bonkei, ikebana, and other traditional arts and crafts as arranged by General MacArthur's headquarters. Many of the older and limited varieties of trees were no longer available, and the bonsai considered in fashion changed partly because of this shortage. Copper wire now largely replaced ordinary iron wire for shaping the better trees, but the latter still would be used for mass-produced commercial bonsai.

=== Modern bonsai ===
Following World War II, a number of trends made the Japanese tradition of bonsai increasingly accessible to Western and world audiences. One key trend was the increase in the number, scope, and prominence of bonsai exhibitions. For example, the Kokufu-ten bonsai displays reappeared in 1947 after a four-year cancellation and became annual affairs. These displays continue to this day, and are by invitation only for eight days in February. In October 1964, a great exhibition was held in Hibya Park by the private Kokufu Bonsai Association, reorganized into the Nippon Bonsai Association, to mark the Tokyo Olympics. A commemorative album titled Gems of Bonsai and Suiseki was published in Japanese and English. Other countries began presenting bonsai exhibitions as well, with recurring events now taking place in Taiwan and a number of other Asian countries, Australia, the United States, several European countries, and others. Currently, Japan continues to host regular exhibitions with the world's largest numbers of bonsai specimens and the highest recognized specimen quality.

Another key trend was the increase in books on bonsai and related arts, now being published for the first time in English and other languages for audiences outside Japan. In 1952, Yuji Yoshimura, son of a leader in the Japanese bonsai community, collaborated with German diplomat and author Alfred Koehn to give bonsai demonstrations. The first formal bonsai courses opened to the public and outsiders in Tokyo. Koehn had been an enthusiast before the war, and his 1937 book Japanese Tray Landscapes had been published in English in Peking. Yoshimura's 1957 book The Art of Bonsai, written in English with his student Giovanna M. Halford, addressed both cultivation and aesthetic aspects of bonsai growing and went on to be called the "classic Japanese bonsai bible for westerners" with over thirty printings.

The related art of saikei was introduced to English-speaking audiences in 1963 in Kawamoto and Kurihara's Bonsai-Saikei. This book described tray landscapes made with younger plant material than was traditionally used in bonsai, providing an alternative to the use of large, older plants, few of which had escaped war damage.

Other works in Japanese and English had been published by this time and afterward, a tremendous number of books saw print. Translations and original volumes in over two dozen languages were published over the following decades. Once Japanese was no longer the sole language of bonsai, the number of clubs outside of Asia increased and interaction increased between members of all levels of experience.

A third trend was the increasing availability of expert bonsai training, at first only in Japan and then more widely. In 1967, the first group of Westerners studied at an Ōmiya nursery. Returning to the U.S., these people established the American Bonsai Society. Other groups and individuals from outside Asia then visited and studied at the various Japanese nurseries, occasionally even apprenticing under the masters. These visitors brought back to their local clubs the latest techniques and styles, which were then further disseminated. Japanese teachers also traveled widely, bringing hands-on bonsai expertise to all six continents

By the beginning of the 1970s, these trends were beginning to merge. A large display of bonsai and suiseki was held as part of Expo '70, and formal discussion was made of an international association of enthusiasts. Three monthly magazines were started this year: Bonsai Sekai, Satsuki Kenkyu, and Shizen to Bonsai. In 1975, the first Gafu-ten (Elegant-Style Exhibit) of shohin bonsai (13–25 cm (5–10 in) tall) was held. So was the first Sakufu-ten (Creative Bonsai Exhibit), the only event in which professional bonsai growers exhibit traditional trees under their own names rather than under the name of the owner. It was organized by Hideo Kato (1918–2001) at Daimaru Department Store in Tokyo.

The first World Bonsai Convention was held in Osaka during the World Bonsai and Suiseki Exhibition in 1980. Nine years later, a series of World Bonsai Conventions was launched by the newly formed World Bonsai Friendship Federation (WBFF) in Omiya. These conventions attracted several hundreds of participants from dozens of countries and have since been held every four years at different locations around the globe: 1993, Orlando, Florida; 1997, Seoul, Korea; 2001, Munich, Germany; 2005, Washington, D.C.; 2009, San Juan, Puerto Rico; 2013, Jitan, Jiangsu, China; 2017, Saitama, Saitama, Japan; and 2022's virtual convention in Perth, Australia, which replaced the one originally scheduled a year earlier but was postponed because of the COVID-19 pandemic.

The final trend supporting world involvement in bonsai is the widening availability of specialized bonsai plant stock, soil components, tools, pots, and other accessory items. Bonsai nurseries in Japan advertise and ship specimen bonsai world-wide. Most countries have local nurseries providing plant stock as well, although finding specimen bonsai is more difficult outside Japan and bonsai enthusiasts will often start with local trees that have not been pre-shaped into candidate bonsai. Japanese bonsai soil components, such as Akadama clay, are available worldwide, and local suppliers also provide similar materials in many locations. Specialized bonsai tools are widely available from Japanese and Chinese sources. Potters around the globe provide material to hobbyists and specialists in many countries.

Bonsai has now reached a worldwide audience. There are over fourteen hundred books on bonsai and the related arts in at least twenty-eight languages available in over one-hundred-and-ten countries and territories. There are also print magazines, online newsletters, forums, and blogs about Bonsai. The appearances of dwarf trees in films and televisions have been credited as helping Bonsai reach a wider audience. There are at least a hundred thousand enthusiasts in some fifteen hundred clubs and associations worldwide, as well as over five million unassociated hobbyists. There are also conventions and exhibitions worldwide for enthusiasts and the general public.

== See also ==
- Bonsai aesthetics – aesthetics of Japanese tradition in bonsai
- Bonsai cultivation and care – cultivation and care of small, container-grown trees
