= Miniature landscape =

Miniature landscape is a traditional art in East Asia of creating tiny versions of the natural environment such as gardens. It may refer to:

== Japan ==
- Saikei
- Bonsai
  - Bonsai cultivation and care
- Bonkei
- Bonseki

== Others ==
- Penjing (China)
- Hòn Non Bộ (Vietnam)
