= Bonkei =

Japanese three-dimensional landscape art

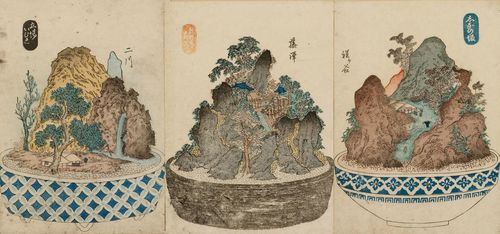
Prints out of the Fifty-three Stations of the Tōkaidō as Potted Landscapes depicting Bonkei, by Utagawa Yoshishige (1848)

A bonkei (盆景, Japanese for "tray landscape") is a temporary or permanent three-dimensional depiction of a landscape in miniature, portrayed using mainly dry materials like rock, papier-mâché or cement mixtures, and sand in a shallow tray. A bonkei contains no living material, in contrast with related Japanese art forms bonsai and saikei: bonsai contain living trees, and saikei contain living trees and other vegetation.

== Description ==
Its three-dimensional character and permanence distinguish bonkei from bonseki, which is a Japanese form of sand-painting that produces mostly-flat images on a display tray, usually for transient viewing before being erased for a new creation. Although bonkei materials are usually dry, flowing water and seasides are often depicted, with varying colors of gravel or sand making up the land and the water elements. A bonkei may also contain miniature figures of people, animals, buildings, bridges, and other common outdoor items.

The goal of the form is to provide an aesthetically pleasing miniature landscape for display and contemplation. The landscape is depicted in full three dimensions, and contained in a wide, low-sided tray. Raised areas representing river banks, hills, cliffs, or mountains are built up from sculptable materials like ciment fondu, clay, papier mache, or a dried and powdered peat called keto in Japan. These sculpted elements are frequently painted to resemble the natural environment as closely as possible, for example, through painting ice, rock, and vegetation colors onto sculpted mountains. Flat areas representing plains or open water are covered with colored sand or gravel. Real rocks may be embedded in the landscape. Bonkei displays might also have a backdrop screen, portraying, for example, specific landscape elements or an abstract skyscape. Bonkei screen backgrounds are not built into the bonkei specimen and can be removed, changed, or moved to another bonkei as needed.

Human and animal figurines and miniature models of structures and vehicles are placed on top of the bonkei's base landscape to create a fully realized scene. Even model trees and other vegetation may be incorporated, though live plants are not generally considered elements of bonkei. These small props are often handcrafted in older bonkei, while bonkei produced in current times may also make use of commercially-produced materials and models. The completed bonkei can be displayed in the home similar to "a bonsai, a painting, or a floral arrangement – at proper height, against an uncluttered background".

Bonkei is similar in some ways to the Japanese saikei (plant landscape), Chinese penjing, or Vietnamese hon non bo art forms. Although the aesthetic goals and practical aspects of model railroads are quite different, some similarities with bonkei can be seen in the model railroader's depiction of the natural environment. Robert Behme says that bonkei differs from saikei in that a bonkei "is essentially a dry landscape, and living plants are rarely used; a saikei depends exclusively on living plants for effect." As a result of this key difference, many bonkei specimens can last a long time with no maintenance, where a saikei requires frequent tending and a favorable environment for growth of the trees and other vegetation it contains.

== Fifty-three Stations of the Tōkaidō as Potted Landscapes ==
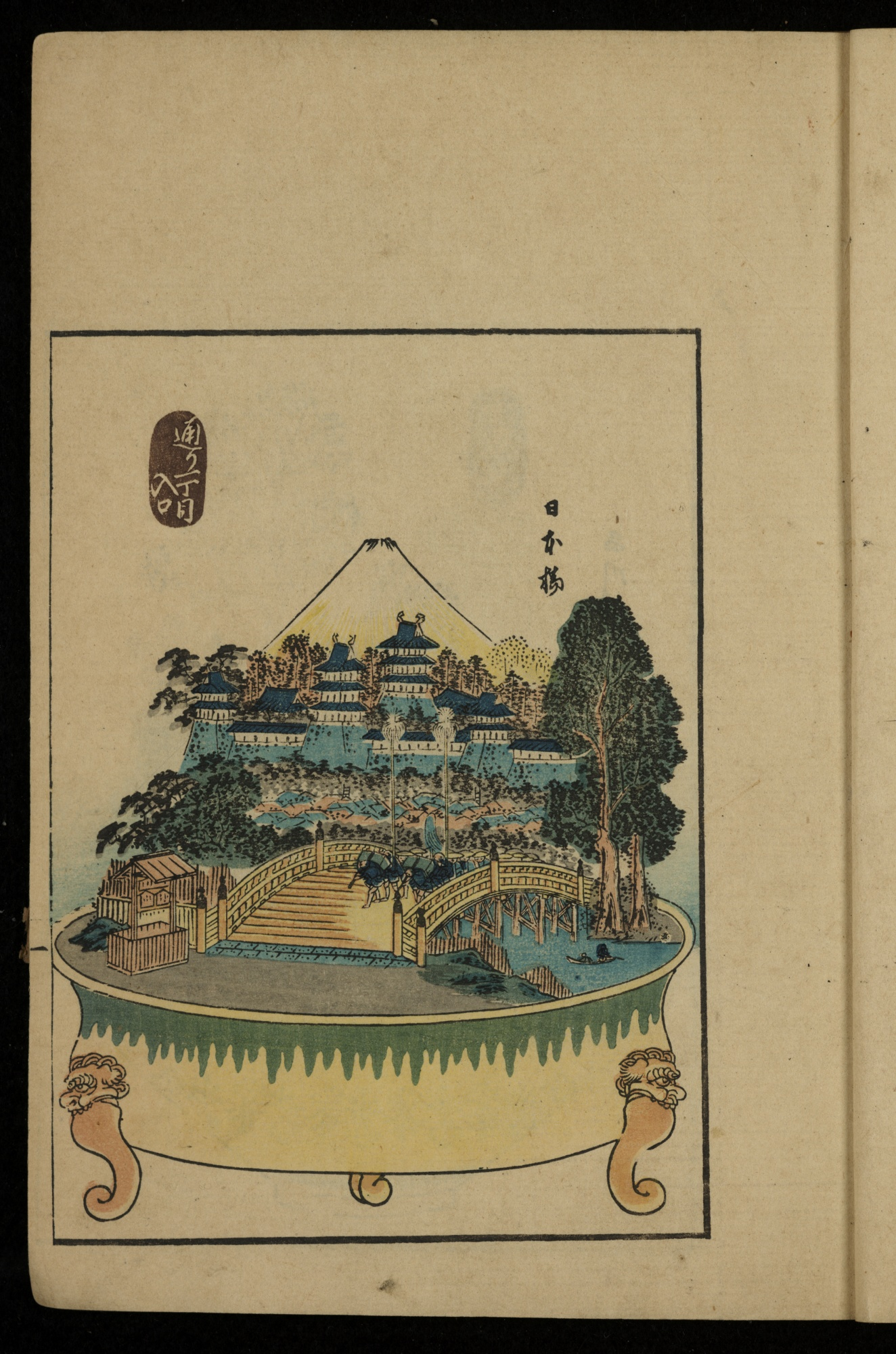
Color print depicting a bonkei modeled after Station 1 of The Fifty-three Stations of the Tōkaidō

Color print of Station 1 of The Fifty-three Stations of the Tōkaidō

In 1848, a relatively unknown artist named Utagawa Yoshishige (歌川芳重) created and published a book of colored prints depicting bonkei specimens, titled Fifty-three Stations of the Tōkaidō as Potted Landscapes (Tokaido Gojusan-eki Hachiyama Edyu). Each bonkei piece was designed and created by Kimura Tōsen for Utagawa Yoshishige to depict, and the book's introduction was written by Kimura Tōsen's son.

The book appears to have been inspired by the famed ukiyo-e artist Utagawa Hiroshige's book of art prints The Fifty-three Stations of the Tōkaidō, published as two volumes in 1833–1834. Each print is a scene, generally an exterior setting, from a famous traveler's route of 19th-century Japan. Kimura Tōsen's bonkei specimens, and the associated prints, show what appear to be the same locations.

For example, the first station of The Fifty-three Stations of the Tōkaidō depicts the ancient bridge symbolizing the entrance to Edo. The print shows a crowd of porters and others approaching over the bridge, city roofs in the background. In 53 Stations of the Tōkaidō as Potted Landscapes (vol. 1, p. 7), a similar bridge carries similar travelers from the city across the river.

The Public Domain Review states that "[t]here are two main arts of the potted landscape in Japanese tradition - saikei and bonkei. . . . It seems that these landscapes created by Kimura Tōsen are the latter." The bonkei in The Fifty-three Stations of the Tōkaidō appear in decorated, mid-depth bowls and rectangular trays of similar depth. Visible differences from the related art of bonsai include the deeper bowl and tray shapes, which are typically shallow in bonsai displays, and external decorations on the bowl surface, where bonsai are usually displayed in plain glazed pots. Some of the depictions contain models of buildings and torii, roadways, vehicles (including water vehicles large and small), and human figures, none of which appear in formal Japanese bonsai displays.

A few of the bonkei also show background landscape elements, such as Mount Fuji, that are not sculpted into the bonkei itself. These background images resemble the hanging scroll in a traditional Japanese home's tokonoma alcove, often displayed behind a living bonsai specimen. Although the bonkei specimens from 53 Stations of the Tōkaidō as Potted Landscapes appear potted in containers as small as a bonsai specimen, most of them are robustly three-dimensional with landscape portrayed at various heights and slopes within the container. This characteristic distinguishes them from most traditional bonsai designs, in which the earth surface is simple, usually slightly domed, and undecorated except for the bonsai tree(s) and surface moss.

The current document sources do not have details on the materials Kimura Tōsen used, but the depiction of water appears to be done with dry materials, and depictions of plant life are not living plants. Bodies of water in the bowls often show pebbled surfaces, indicating fine, colored gravel or sand. The mature-looking trees in many of the bonkei have slender, well-articulated branches and tiny foliage, in sizes almost impossible to replicate with living specimens. These and other similarities in subject, style, and materials link Kimura Tōsen's 19th-century specimens to the bonkei art form as currently practiced in Japan.

== See also ==
- Bonsai
- Bonseki
- Saikei
- Suiseki
- Penjing
- Hòn non bộ
- Fifty-three Stations of the Tōkaidō as Potted Landscapes
- Rhymeprose on a Miniature Landscape Garden
