= Saikei =

Japanese art of creating miniature landscapes

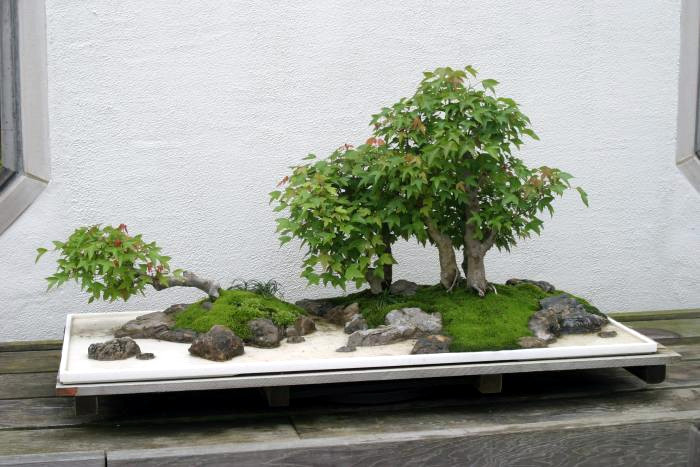
Trees, soil, and rocks form a miniature living landscape in this example of a saikei.

Saikei (Japanese: 栽景, Hepburn: saikei; lit. 'planted landscape') is the Japanese art of creating tray landscapes that combine miniature living trees with soil, rocks, water, and related vegetation (like ground cover) in a single tray or similar container. A saikei landscape is meant to evoke a natural location through its overall topography, choice of ground materials, and the plant species used. Saikei is a descendant of the similar Japanese arts of bonsai, bonseki, and bonkei, and it is related less directly to similar miniature-landscape arts such as the Chinese penjing and the Vietnamese hòn non bộ.

Saikei differs from related Japanese art forms in some key ways, concentrating on the evocation of a natural living landscape rather than on the character of individual trees. Mixed vegetation, including grasses and small flowering plants, make the saikei a more complex living image than the more ascetic-looking bonsai. As a result, the shape of the ground is very important in a saikei display, while it is of little importance in designing bonsai. According to Lew Buller, Toshio Kawamoto (the founder of the saikei form) "was adamant that his living landscapes were not bonsai", citing saikei rules such as the mandatory use of stones and the placement of trees and roots above the rim of the tray.

Certain bonsai styles allow for the constrained use of stones as the base for trees in the root-over-rock style (sekijoju) and the growing-in-a-rock style (ishizuke), but traditional Japanese bonsai specimens do not contain landscapes shaped from mixed soil or stones. Saikei designs, on the other hand, are firmly based on a physical layout of stones and imaginative groundscaping; less so on the trunk shape, branch placement, and trimmed foliage of the small trees. Deborah Koreshoff, author of Bonsai: Its Art, Science, and Philosophy, describes the distinction:

[W]hen we make a bonsai, the main feature is the tree. With saikei, however, success depends greatly on the blending and balance of trees, rocks and soil. It is the clever placement of rocks that enhances the appearance of trees which are often young and immature and it is the way the soil is shaped and landscaped that sets off the rocks and makes them appear natural.

The arts of bonseki and bonkei also depict miniature landscapes in trays, but do not incorporate living trees or other flora. In bonseki, simple landscapes are portrayed on flat trays using sand and stones; in bonkei, rocks and sculptable materials (e.g. cement) are formed into hills and mountains rising out of ground materials like sand or gravel. Miniature figures of people, animals, buildings, and other outdoor elements may be placed on a bonkei, but would be out of place on a saikei. The presence of living materials means saikei are challenging to preserve and display relative to bonkei.

A typical saikei is contained in a large ceramic tray with low sides. Within the tray, rocks and soil are arranged to suggest a natural landscape, often modeled on a specific type of real landscape, such as a seaside or a mountain path. Small living trees are planted in the soil and may be arranged to emphasize perspective. The trees themselves are similar to bonsai trees, but are usually less elaborately shaped; they are selected and cultivated to look like mature trees that match the landscape. Non-tree plant specimens may also be used in saikei, such as ground cover or other small plants.

== History ==
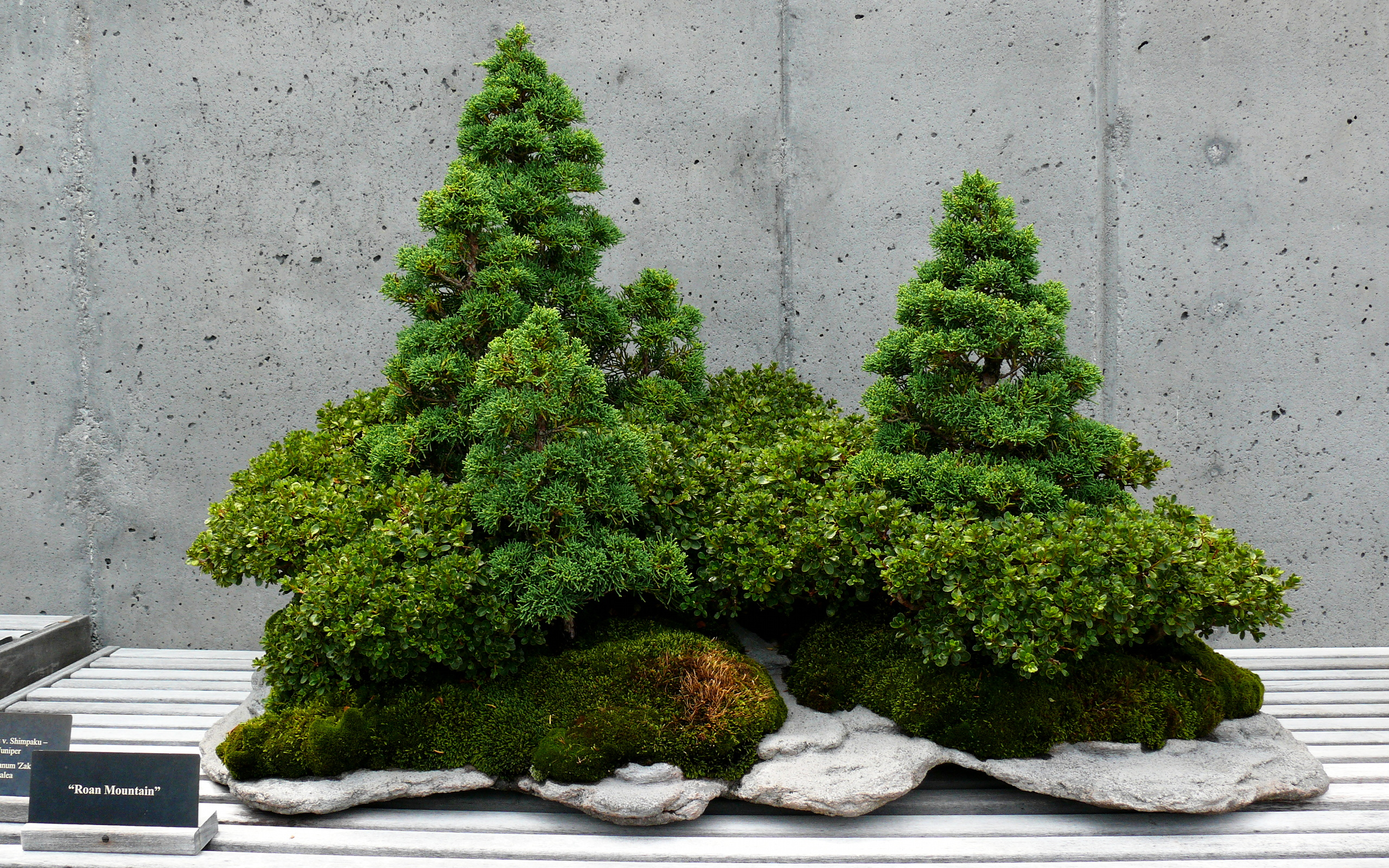
Multi-species saikei named Roan Mountain contains Shimpaku juniper and Zakura azalea.

The school of saikei was founded in Japan by Toshio Kawamoto after World War II. Kawamoto was born in 1917, the eldest child of the bonsai master Tokichi Kawamoto, and was trained in the art of bonsai. In 1960, following his father's death, he ran the family bonsai nursery Meiju-En. He actively promoted the practice of saikei after this time, publishing two seminal books on saikei (Bonsai-Saikei and Saikei: Living Landscapes in Miniature) and participating in the creation of the Nippon Bonsai-Saikei Institute and the Nippon Saikei Association.

At the time Kawamoto began developing the rules and form of saikei, the practice of bonsai was at a critical low point in Japan. The labor-intensive cultivation of bonsai had been near impossible under wartime conditions. Many bonsai, in development or completed, had died in the nation's major collections, as well as in the gardens of individuals across the country. Post-war economic conditions made the purchase and cultivation of a real bonsai almost impossible for average Japanese households.

Kawamoto created a simple form of tree display providing many of the aesthetic and contemplative qualities of bonsai, while also supporting the cultivation of plant stock that could eventually be used as bonsai material. He based this art form mainly on the principles of group plantings from bonsai and rock displays from bonkei and bonseki. His original objective was to age and thicken up the trunks of young nursery stock. Saikei was a way for inexpensive plants and stones to be brought together in a pleasing arrangement, easily accessible to the average person. As a saikei specimen aged, it would produce candidate bonsai trees, which could be removed from the saikei for cultivation as bonsai.

As a relatively young art form, Japanese saikei does not have deep traditions of its own. But it is related to a number of older confined-landscape forms popular in Asia, including Japan's bonkei, the Chinese art of penjing, and the Vietnamese art of hòn non bộ. The term penjing applies both to individual trees growing in containers, similar to bonsai, and also to detailed miniature landscapes which include trees, other plants, rocks, soil, water, and miniature figurines of people, animals, and other items. Similarly, hòn non bộ emphasizes the creation of stylized miniature islands projecting from a body of water and carrying a burden of trees and other plants.

In post-war Japan, saikei was seen as an environmentally and economically responsible way to propagate trees for eventual use in bonsai. Even economically constrained individuals or families could enjoy many of the contemplative and aesthetic benefits of bonsai, without incurring the effort and the costs related to mature bonsai specimens. The same benefits accrue to saikei today.

== Practice ==
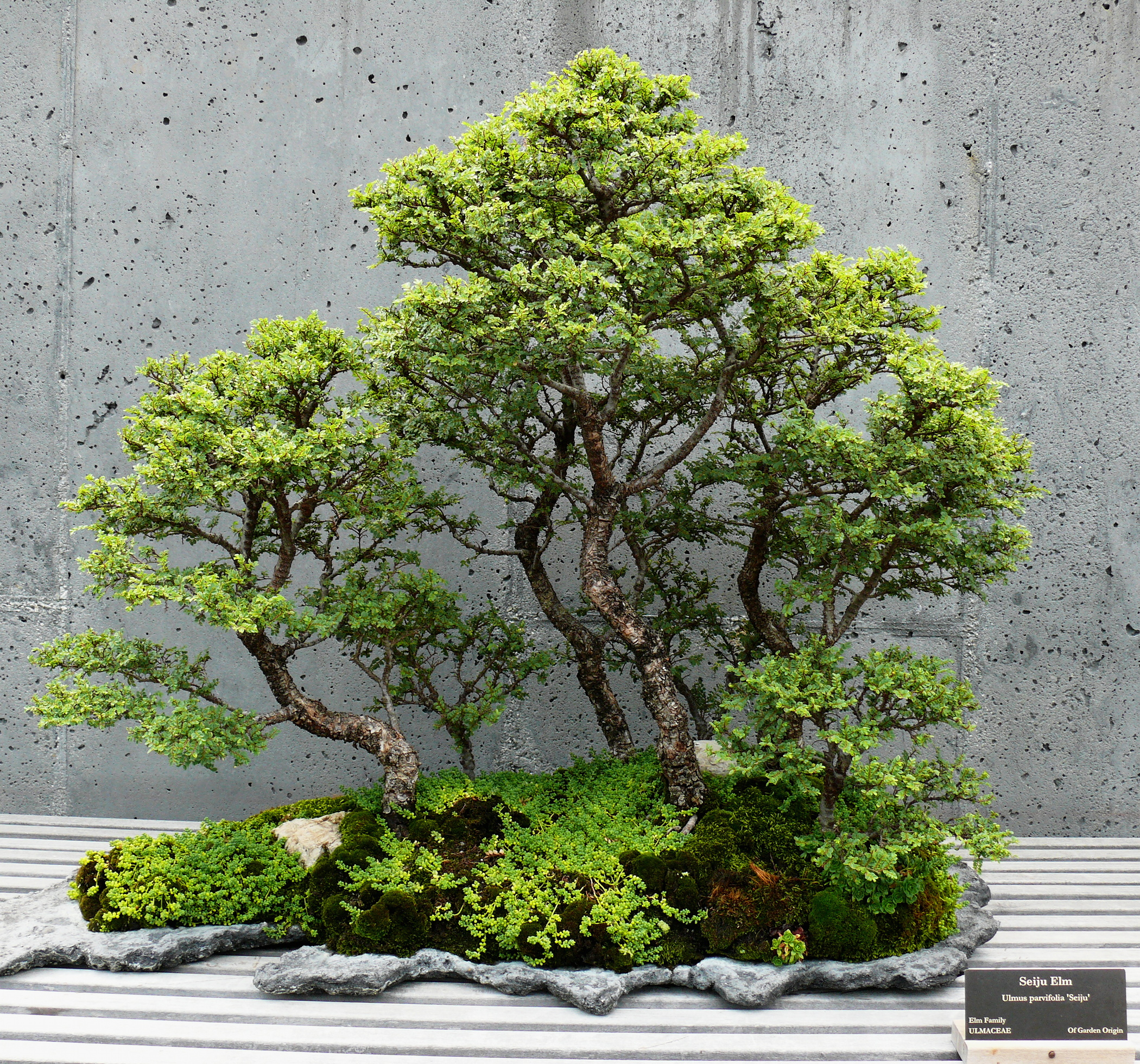
Saikei featuring Seiju elm

Saikei was designed to be an easier practice to participate in than bonsai. A saikei container provides liberal quantities of soil, easing the burden of careful watering and root pruning that mark bonsai cultivation. Saikei plantings are quick to assemble, with first-time participants able to create an effective result in a few hours. The trees can be very young and therefore inexpensive, and none of the other materials except the tray itself cost much. The trees themselves do not require a great deal of shaping or other manipulation, compared to bonsai's complex and time-consuming development practices. As a result, saikei is a good fit for beginners and for those who wish to spend little on the hobby of growing dwarfed trees.

A saikei display does contain numerous living plants, however, and requires growing conditions that allow them to thrive. The saikei will be designed to use plants that all share similar cultivation requirements, particularly soil type and watering. The general climate requirements of the plants will also be similar: it is difficult to cultivate plants from different hardiness zones in a single saikei display. Saikei containing plants that require outdoor conditions will be grown and displayed out of doors, possibly with special protection in winter months.

As a particular saikei ages, some of its trees may grow out of proportion to the rest of the display. This change is expected and in fact is one of the goals of saikei. The owner has two choices, to reduce the size of the large trees, or to remove them from the saikei and grow them separately. Reducing their size involves bonsai-related techniques such as pruning. Removing oversize trees from the saikei leads naturally to potting them individually and cultivating them as bonsai. After removal of these trees, the saikei can be augmented with new trees, restyled to suit the remaining trees, or dismantled and redesigned to a new plan. In all cases, the trees are retained and continue to be cultivated under the saikei principle of developing potential new bonsai.

== Aesthetics ==
=== Design ===
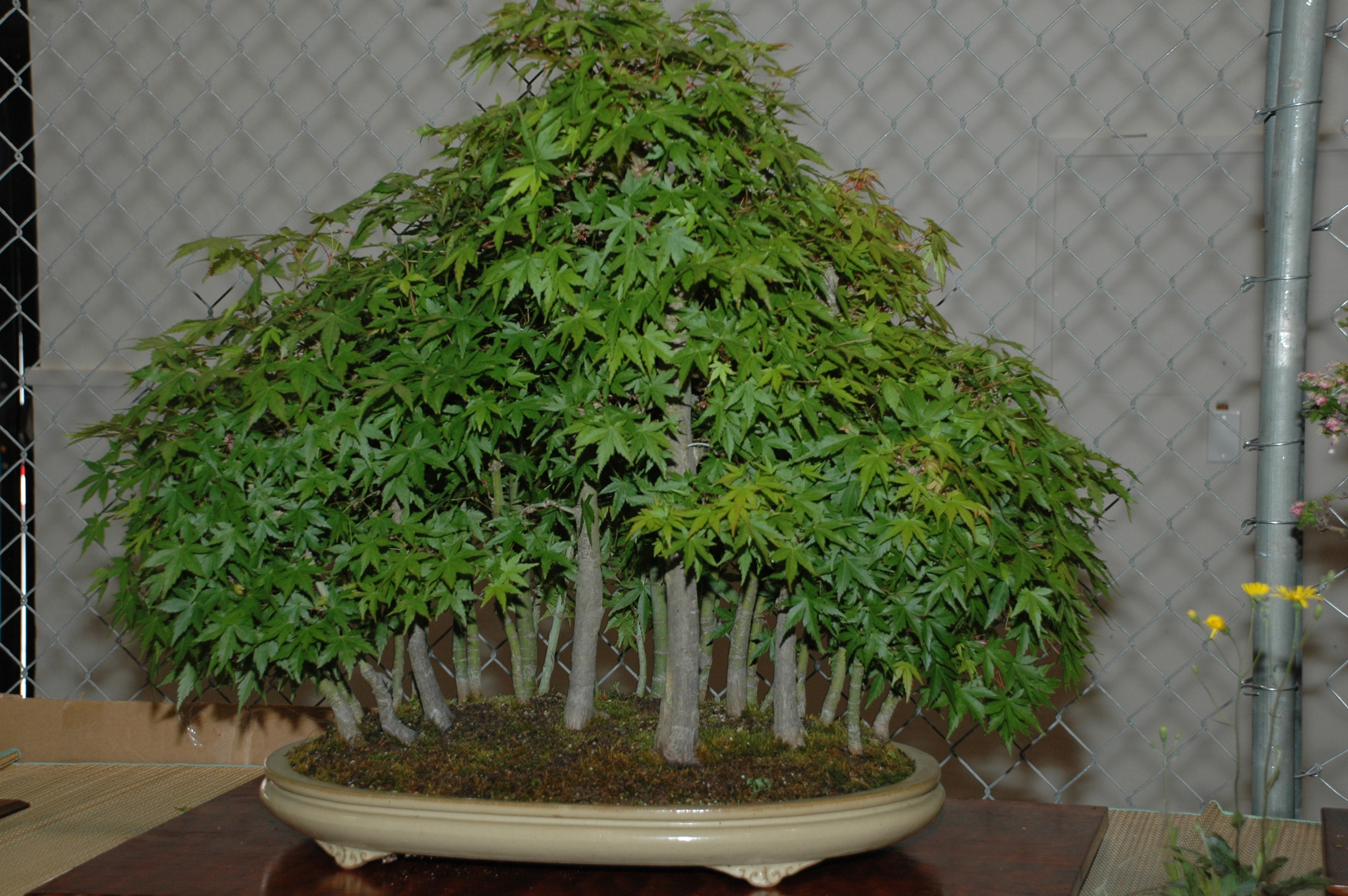
Typical bonsai multiple planting, with simple topography and single vegetation mass

The art of saikei overlaps bonsai to some extent, as bonsai includes a tradition of multiple-tree plantings. Saikei has a much stronger emphasis on the shape and structure of the landscape than does bonsai, and has much greater freedom in the layout and materials of that landscape. Trees can appear singly or in groups at any suitable spot in the landscape, even on the sides and tops of rocks representing mountains or hills. There is no rule to mass the trees together in a contiguous unit in a saikei. Bonsai multiple-tree styles, on the other hand, have very simple landscapes, usually a simple plateau or slight dome of soil beneath the trees. The bonsai plantings are generally developed to display a unified silhouette involving all the trees, in which they produce a single foliage mass behind and to the left and right of the trunks. In bonsai, trees completely dominate the group planting, while in saikei, trees simply decorate the saikei landscape.

A saikei must contain rocks, which may play the role of mountains, cliff faces, stone outcroppings, stream beds, shorelines, or other aspects of the landscape. They are the skeleton of the landscape, and appear prominently. In bonsai group plantings, rocks are rare and if present are inconspicuous and subjugated to the trees.

Saikei does not focus on the detailed form of each tree, which is a prime objective for bonsai. The trees in saikei are not expected to be the mature, thick-trunked specimens that are common in bonsai. For the trees to be in scale with even a large saikei display, they cannot be much more than four to six inches in height. Smaller saikei displays may require even smaller trees. As a result, the saikei trees are often immature and thin-trunked, with small root structures and simple branching. Moreover, the use of small trees means that small-foliaged species are preferred. Example varieties include small-foliaged juniper, Hinoki cypress, azalea, and Chinese elm. The aesthetic impact of the saikei display results not from striking individual tree specimens, but from the builder's general landscape design, the cumulative visual impact of several or many live trees, the rocks and soil of the landscape, and the variety of other plant forms placed in the display.

Saikei allows multiple species of tree to be placed in a single landscape, and allows other plant forms like flowers and grasses, while multiple plantings in bonsai are typically a single species of tree with moss alone allowed as additional vegetation. Because of this flexibility in plant materials, saikei can be designed to show the progress of the seasons in much greater variety and detail than can a mono-culture bonsai planting. Aesthetically pleasant reference to the seasons is an important tradition in Japanese gardens, and a saikei display can be much more garden-like than a bonsai display. Deciduous and flowering trees, which change through the growing season, can be mixed with conifers that will remain green all winter. Spring leaves and flowers, summer fruit, autumn coloration and leaf-fall, and the contrast of bare-branched deciduous trees with snow-covered evergreens can represent the annual cycle of an entire garden in the space of a tea-table.

Saikei works with a palette consisting only of plants, rock, soil, and occasionally water. Bonkei, penjing, and hòn non bộ allow the inclusion of miniatures in the scene. These miniatures can include wooden structures like huts, bridges, or boats. Ceramic figurines of people and animals are also common, and all miniatures contribute to the sense of scale in an individual container. Saikei landscapes are simpler and more abstract, emphasizing the landscape's natural shapes and materials and leaving viewers to engage their imaginations. In this, saikei is similar to bonsai, which also avoids decoration apart from moss and rock in the container.

=== Aesthetic impact ===
Saikei displays can span a range extending from the austerity of a classic bonsai to the richness of a Japanese garden in miniature. At this point in the development of the art form, there are no restrictions on the number of plant varieties in a display or the complexity of the landscape. The saikei designer can suggest wabi or sabi with a simple planting among aged and weathered rocks, or evoke an entire mountain forest with multiple peaks, trees, seasonal flowers and grasses, ground cover, and moss. Some saikei even span two or more containers, which when placed near each other create an expansive and complex image (as seen, for example, in the photograph above, labeled 'Trees, soil, and rocks form a miniature living landscape').

Writers on saikei, particularly the founder Toshio Kawamoto and Herb Gustafson, who studied at Kawamoto's Bonsai Saikei Institute, emphasize that the design and execution of a saikei should portray a realistic natural landscape. Austerity and simplicity are not the important principles in saikei that they are in bonsai. A saikei developed in Kawamoto's style will be complex in topography, rich with vegetation, and strongly evocative of a realistic location in nature. Trees will have natural shapes, without contortion. Trees and ground cover will have relative sizes that almost constitute a model of a landscape, free from exaggerated proportions. Plants will be selected to match the simulated location, so that a single planting will contain only species likely to be found together. If bonsai imply the aesthetic principles of the abstract and austere Japanese Zen garden, saikei resemble traditional Japanese tsukiyama gardens like Suizen-ji Jōju-en, which often model features from famous real landscapes, such as the replica of Mt. Fuji in Suizen-ji Jōju-en.

With a briefer tradition and simpler aesthetic rules than bonsai, saikei is more accessible to the amateur. According to Kawamoto, "[s]aikei has no bounds; it avoids the rigid formality that is often evident in bonsai, lending itself more to experimentation and freedom in composition." Simple aesthetics mean a saikei display is easier to create and to appreciate than one of its parent forms. The viewer's pleasure arises from the ingenuity of the designer in creating a miniature of nature, a natural aesthetic response that requires no schooling and can be enjoyed by almost any observer.

== See also ==
- Bonsai
- Bonsai cultivation and care
- Bonseki
- Bonkei
- Penjing
- Rhymeprose on a Miniature Landscape Garden
