= Hòn non bộ =

Vietnamese art of making miniature landscapes

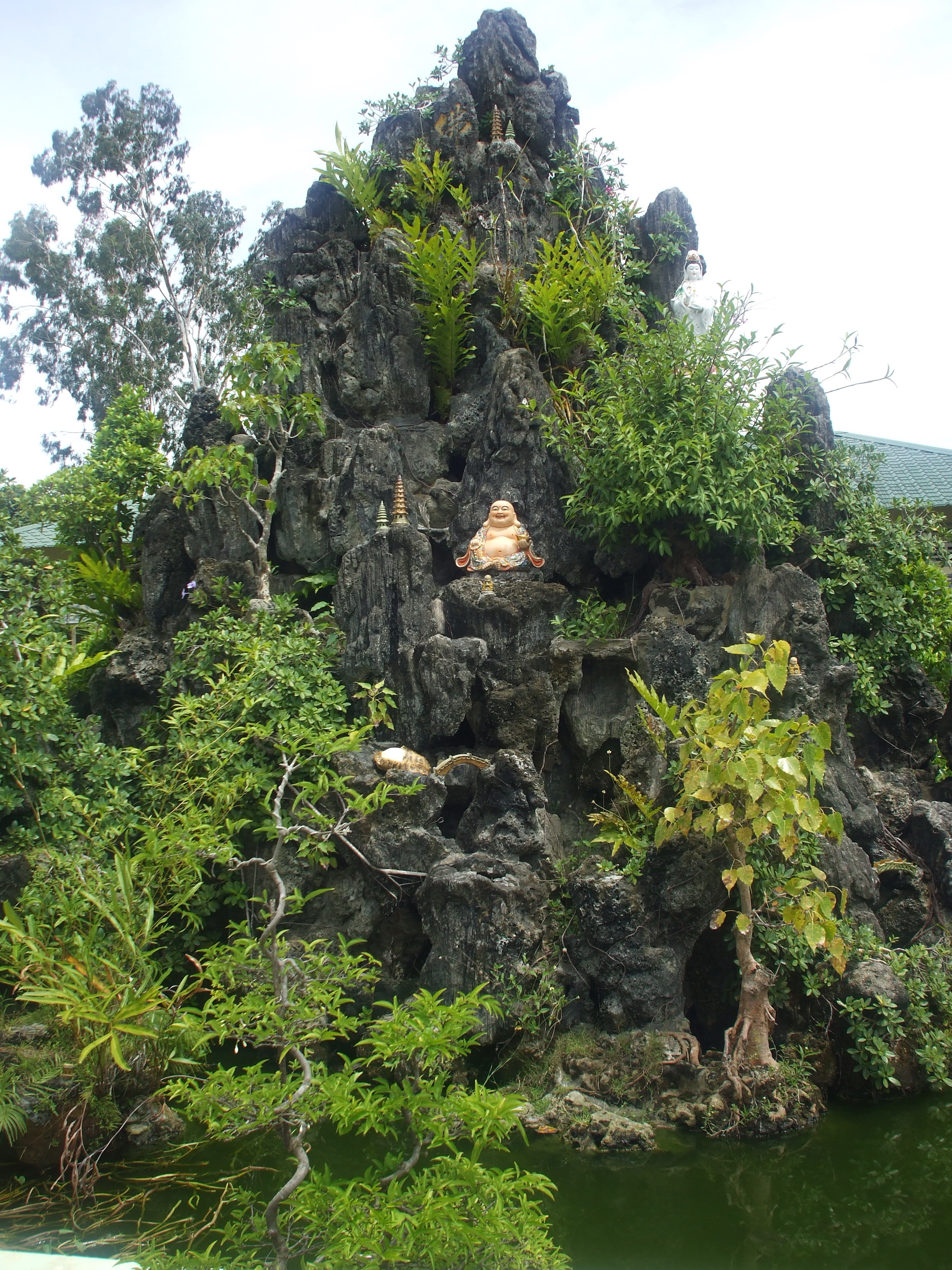
A type of Hòn non bộ popular in Vietnam

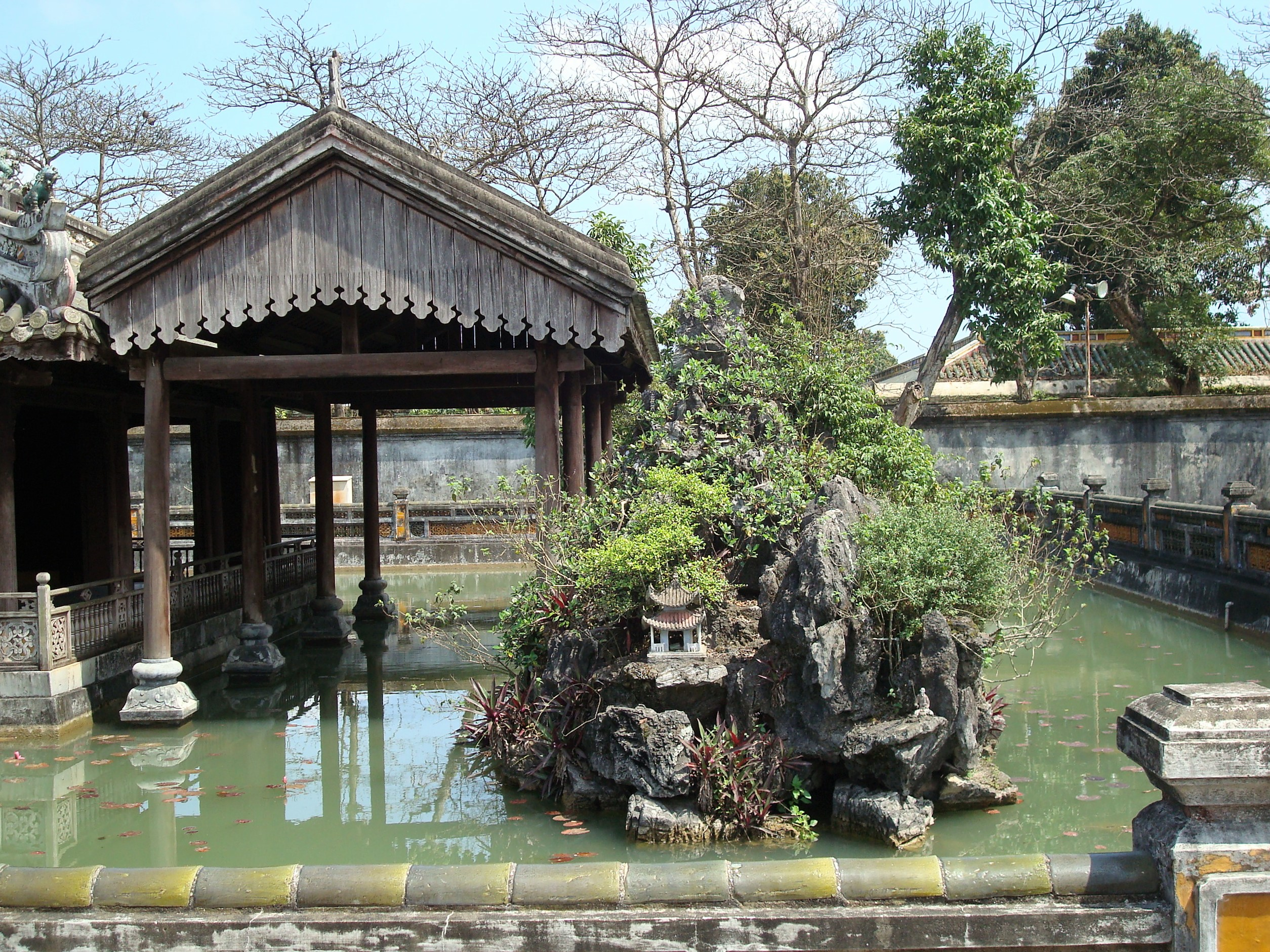
Hòn non bộ in the pond of Diên Thọ Palace in the Imperial City of Huế

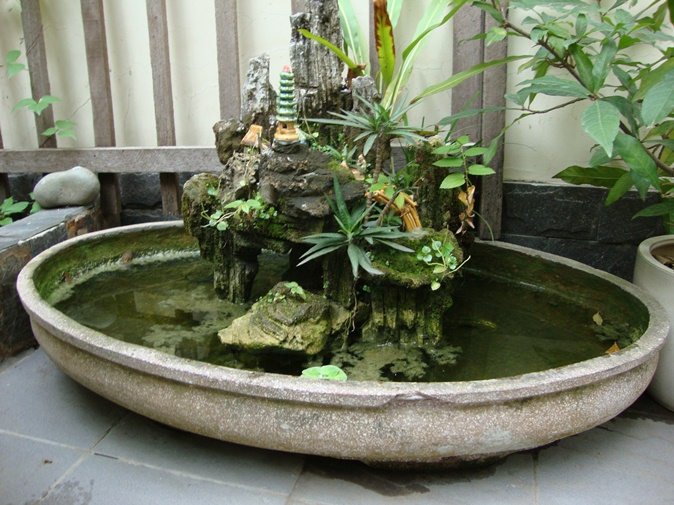
Hòn non bộ which included stones, plants, little figures, waterfall and aquarium

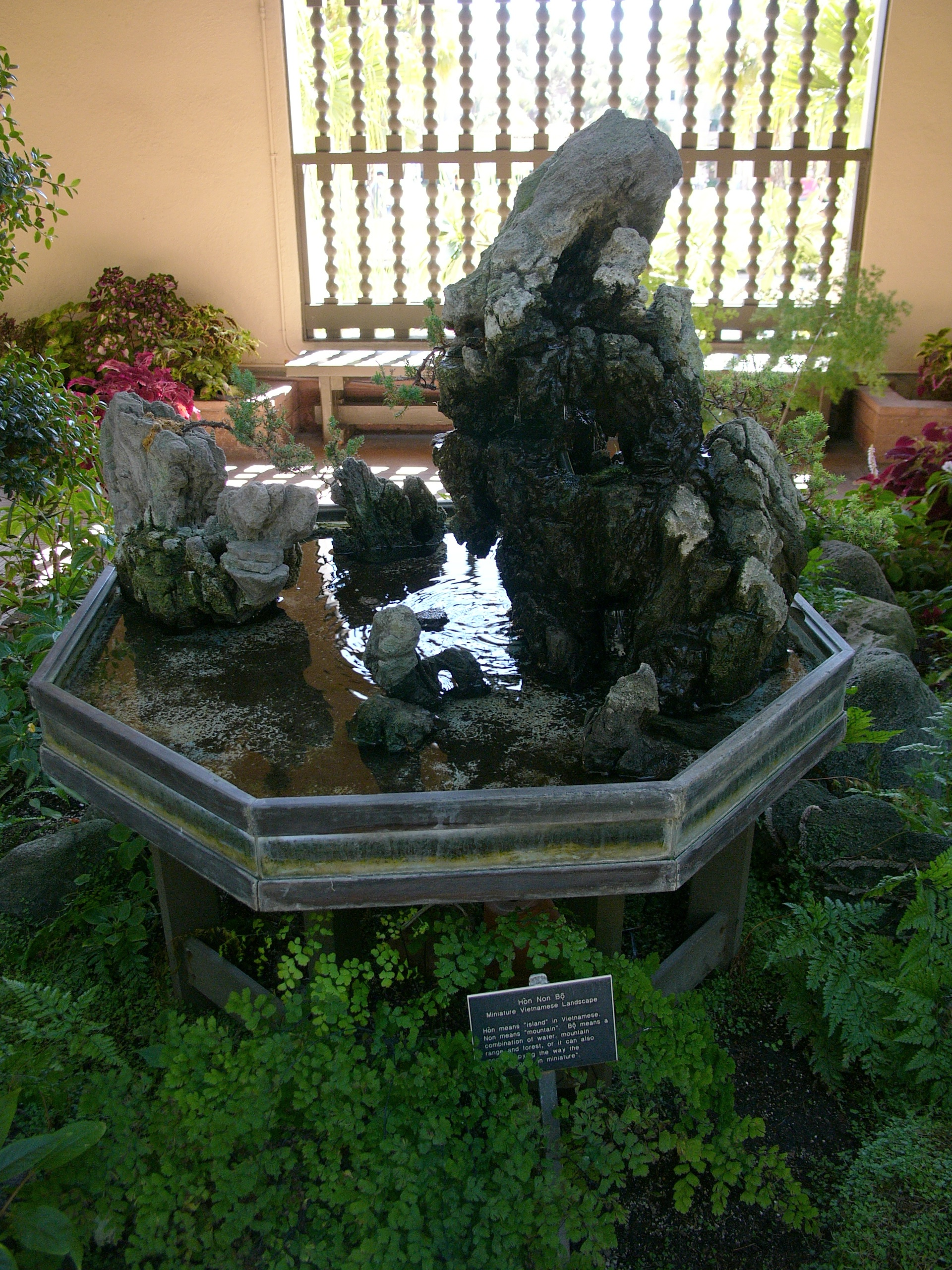
Hòn non bộ, at the Botanical Building

Hòn non bộ (chữ Nôm: 𡉕𡽫部) is the Vietnamese art of making miniature landscapes, imitating the scenery of the islands, mountains and surrounding environment as found in nature. It is a Vietnamese equivalent of the Chinese art of penzai, as was bonsai in Japan.

The phrase Hòn non bộ comes from the Vietnamese language: Hòn (𡉕) means islands, non (𡽫) means mountains, and bộ 部 means a set, in this context, the islands and the mountains are one set.

Hòn non bộ may be quite large and elaborate or small and simple. It was used to grace the courtyard entrance of the traditional Vietnamese home. Throughout Vietnamese history, Hòn non bộ have been built for emperors, generals, and other important people as monuments, decorations, personal vistas, and as cultural icons.

== History ==
Miniature landscape art was first recorded after Vietnamese independence in the year 939. A version of this was the Hòn non bộ (lit., "island-mountain-panorama"), which is designed to be seen from all sides. People, even the poorest, placed rocks and plants surrounded by water in containers or basins originally carved from stone. (Later these were formed from stucco, and then from concrete.) Individual Hòn non bộ could be a foot or two in height. Sometimes these were also known as tiểu cảnh, the art of mini-scenes, where the tree is the main subject and it is larger than the mountains portrayed. Members of royalty built larger versions up to 20 or 25 feet high (with mountains always larger than the backdrop trees). Almost always one or more of these landscapes were included in the grounds of their palaces and temples to form a part of the sacred enclosure. At some point, these were often accompanied by parallel verses in Chinese, stereotyped quotations that everyone knew thanks to popular collections of expressions for use on various occasions. Incense sticks and some miniature figurines might also be a part of their construction. This was done even after Ngô Quyền's death ushered in a period of civil strife.

Temples were built with Hòn non bộ in order to commemorate the deeds of the kings who ruled between the years equivalent to 968 and 1005.

From 1225 to 1400, the Trần dynasty ruled Vietnam and repelled the invading Mongol forces of the Yuan dynasty in 1258, 1285, and 1288. Most of the magnificent palaces were destroyed in the process. These were subsequently rebuilt, complete with Hòn non bộ, using the labor of enemy collaborators.

In 1406, the Chinese Ming dynasty Emperor ordered his army to invade Vietnam and confiscate all things related to that culture, such as books and art objects, and bring them back to China. The following year, the interim Vietnamese ruler was caught by invaders, carnage followed, and all works of art and architecture were destroyed—including Hòn non bộ. Later, the Lê dynasty (1428–1788) rebuilt many of the devastated palaces and Hòn non bộ were very popular features in the renovations. Mini-scenes and miniature landscapes made during this period used Cycas revoluta (sago palms) on the birthdays of kings, lords, and elderly high-class people. The scholar Nguyễn Bỉnh Khiêm (aka Trang Trình, 1491–1585) was said to have used a Hòn non bộ to provide guidance while predicting the fate or destiny of others.

Hòn non bộ, as well as miniature plants and rocks, are mentioned in Đoạn Trường Tân Thanh, a thousand-page book by Nguyễn Du (1766–1820). During the Nguyễn dynasty (1802–1945), the art of miniature plants without much additional landscaping, cây kiểng, flourished. (It was called cây cảnh in the north.) Kings enjoyed planting pines and junipers; mandarins loved growing Thuja orientalis and Casuarina; intellectuals or other notable figures liked Ficus; and lay people devoted themselves to planting mallow (Malva), Tamarindus indica, and Melaleuca leucadendra. Except for those planted by kings, all trees planted for pleasure by mandarins or lay people had to have their tops bent downward because it was considered impertinent to superiors to have treetops growing upward.

A Hòn non bộ was constructed by the Nguyen emperors in the pond of Diên Thọ Palace in the Imperial City of Huế. An example of Hòn non bộ scenery is on display in the Botanical Building in San Diego, California.

== See also ==
- Bonsai – the Japanese art of miniature tree cultivation
- Penjing – Chinese art of miniature tree cultivation
- Saikei – tray gardens using bonsai
- Bonkei – Japanese dry tray landscapes
- Tree shaping – shaping trees for art and structure
