= Penjing =

Chinese miniature trees and landscapes

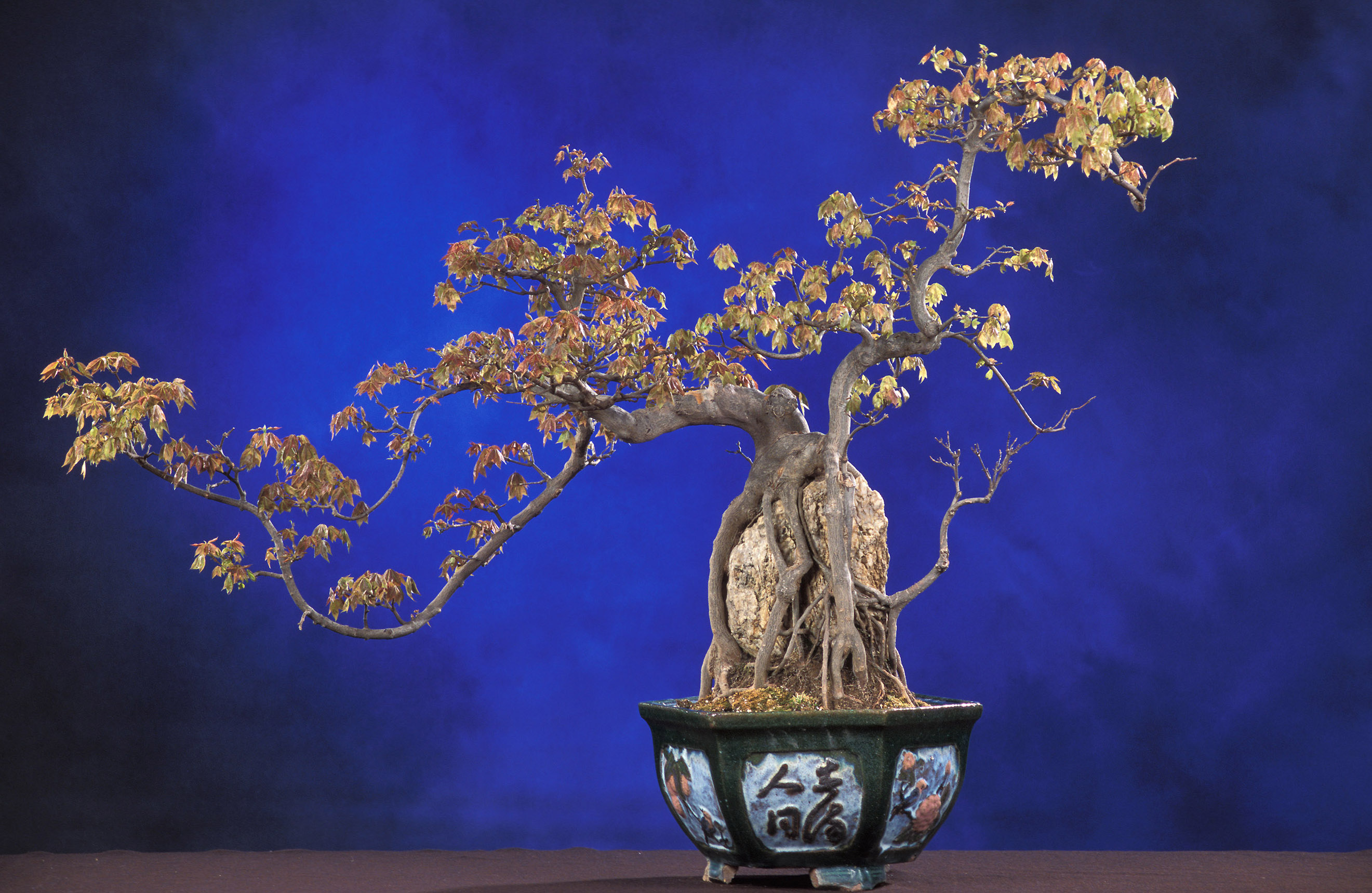
- Penjing in root-over-rock style on display at the Chinese Penjing Collection of the National Bonsai and Penjing Museum in Washington, D.C.
- Chinese: 盆景
- Literal meaning: tray scenery
Transcriptions
Standard Mandarin
- Hanyu Pinyin: pénjǐng
- Bopomofo: ㄆㄣˊ ㄐㄧㄥˇ
- Wade–Giles: p'ên^{2} ching^{3}
Yue: Cantonese
- Jyutping: pun^{4}ging^{2}
Southern Min
- Hokkien POJ: phûn-kéng
- Tâi-lô: phûn-kíng

Alternative Chinese name
- Chinese: 盆栽
- Literal meaning: tray cultivation
Transcriptions
Standard Mandarin
- Hanyu Pinyin: pénzāi
- Bopomofo: ㄆㄣˊ ㄗㄞ
- Wade–Giles: p'ên^{2} tsai
Yue: Cantonese
- Jyutping: pun^{4}zoi^{1}
Southern Min
- Hokkien POJ: phûn-chai
- Tâi-lô: phûn-tsai

Penjing, also known as penzai, is the ancient Chinese art of depicting artistically formed trees, other plants, and landscapes in miniature.

Penjing generally fall into one of three categories:

- Shumu penjing (樹木盆景): Tree penjing that focuses on the depiction of one or more trees and optionally other plants in a container, with the composition's dominant elements shaped by the creator through trimming, pruning, and wiring.
- Shanshui penjing (山水盆景): Landscape penjing that depicts a miniature landscape by carefully selecting and shaping rocks, which are usually placed in a container in contact with water. Small live plants are placed within the composition to complete the depiction.
- Shuihan penjing (水旱盆景): A water and land penjing style that effectively combines the first two, including miniature trees and optionally miniature figures and structures to portray a landscape in detail.

Chinese cultural hegemony gave the practice influence over other cultures, engendering bonsai and saikei in Japan, as well as the miniature living landscapes of hòn non bộ in Vietnam. Generally speaking, tree penjing specimens differ from bonsai by allowing a wider range of tree shapes and by planting them in bright-colored and creatively shaped pots. In contrast, bonsai are more simplified in shape with larger-in-proportion trunks and are planted in unobtrusive, low-sided containers with simple lines and muted colors.

While saikei depicts living landscapes in containers, like water and land penjing, it does not use miniatures to decorate the living landscape. Hòn non bộ focuses on depicting landscapes of islands and mountains, usually in contact with water and decorated with live trees and other plants. Like water and land penjing, hòn non bộ specimens can feature miniature figures, vehicles, and structures. Distinctions among these traditional forms have been blurred by some practitioners outside of Asia, as enthusiasts explore the potential of local plant and pot materials without strict adherence to traditional styling and display guidelines.

== History ==
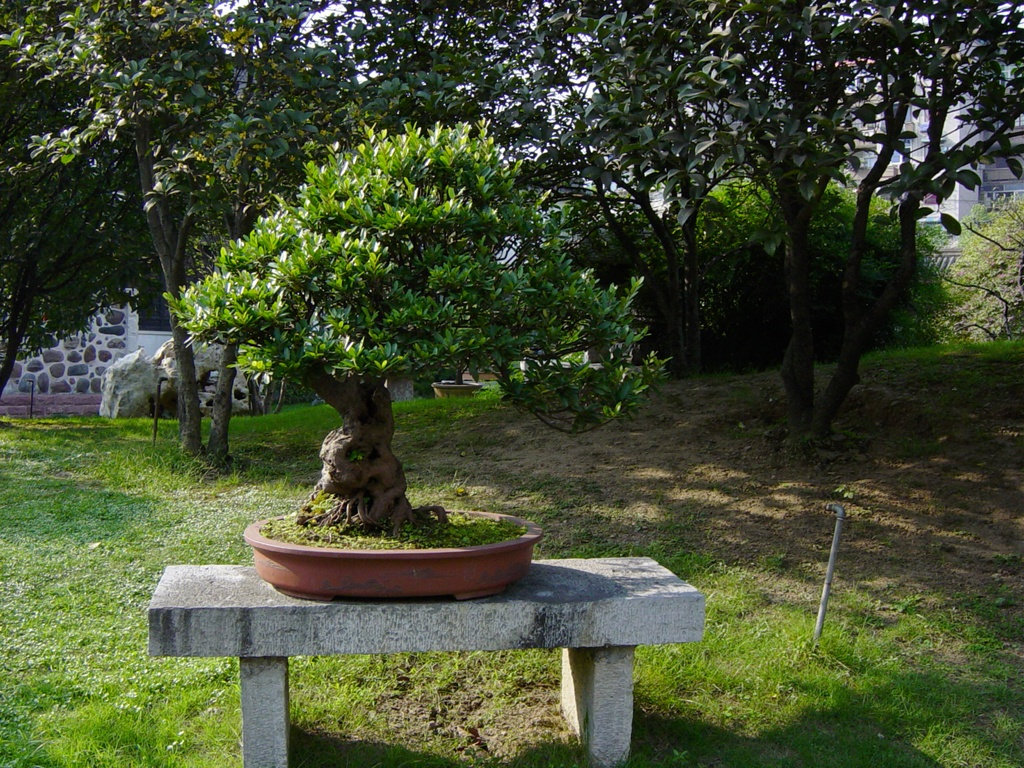
Penjing at the Rock and Penjing Museum in Wuhan, China

Classical Chinese gardens often contain arrangements of miniature trees and rockeries known as penjing. These creations of carefully pruned trees and rocks are small-scale renditions of natural landscapes. They are often referred to as living sculptures or as three-dimensional poetry. Their artistic composition captures the spirit of nature and distinguishes them from ordinary potted plants.

=== Origin of the components ===
The container known as the pen originated in Neolithic China in the Yangshao culture as an earthenware shallow dish with a foot. It was later one of the vessels manufactured in bronze for use in court ceremonies and religious rituals during the Shang dynasty and Zhou dynasty.

When foreign trade introduced into China new herbal aromatics in the 2nd century BC, a unique incense burner was designed. The boshanlu stemmed cup was topped by a perforated lid in the shape of one of the sacred mountains/islands, such as Mount Penglai – focus of a strong contemporary belief – often with the images of mythical persons and beasts throughout the hillsides. Smaller versions of the pen dish were sometimes used as bottom pieces either to catch hot embers or to be filled with water to represent the ocean out of which the sacred mountains/islands arose. Originally made out of bronze, ceramic, or talc stone, some later versions were believed to be stones which occasionally were partly covered with moss and lichens to further heighten the miniature representation.

Since at least the 1st century AD, Daoist mysticism has included the recreating of magical sites in miniature to focus and increase the properties found in the full-size sites. The various schools of Buddhism introduced from India after the mid-2nd century included the meditative dhyana sect, whose translations of Sanskrit texts sometimes used Daoist terminology to convey non-physical concepts. Also, floral altar decorations were introduced and floral designs started to become a dominant force in Chinese art. Five centuries later the Chán school of Buddhism was established, in which renewed Indian dhyana Buddhist teachings were merged with native Chinese Daoism. Chán maintained its more active, vital spirit even as other Buddhist sects were becoming more rigidly formalized.

=== Earliest versions ===
While there were legends dating from at least the 3rd and 4th centuries of Daoist persons said to have had the power to shrink whole landscapes down to small vessel size, written descriptions of miniature landscapes are not known until Tang dynasty times. As the information at that point shows a somewhat developed craft, (then called "punsai") the making of dwarfed tree landscapes had to have been taking place for a while, either in China or possibly based on a form brought in from outside.

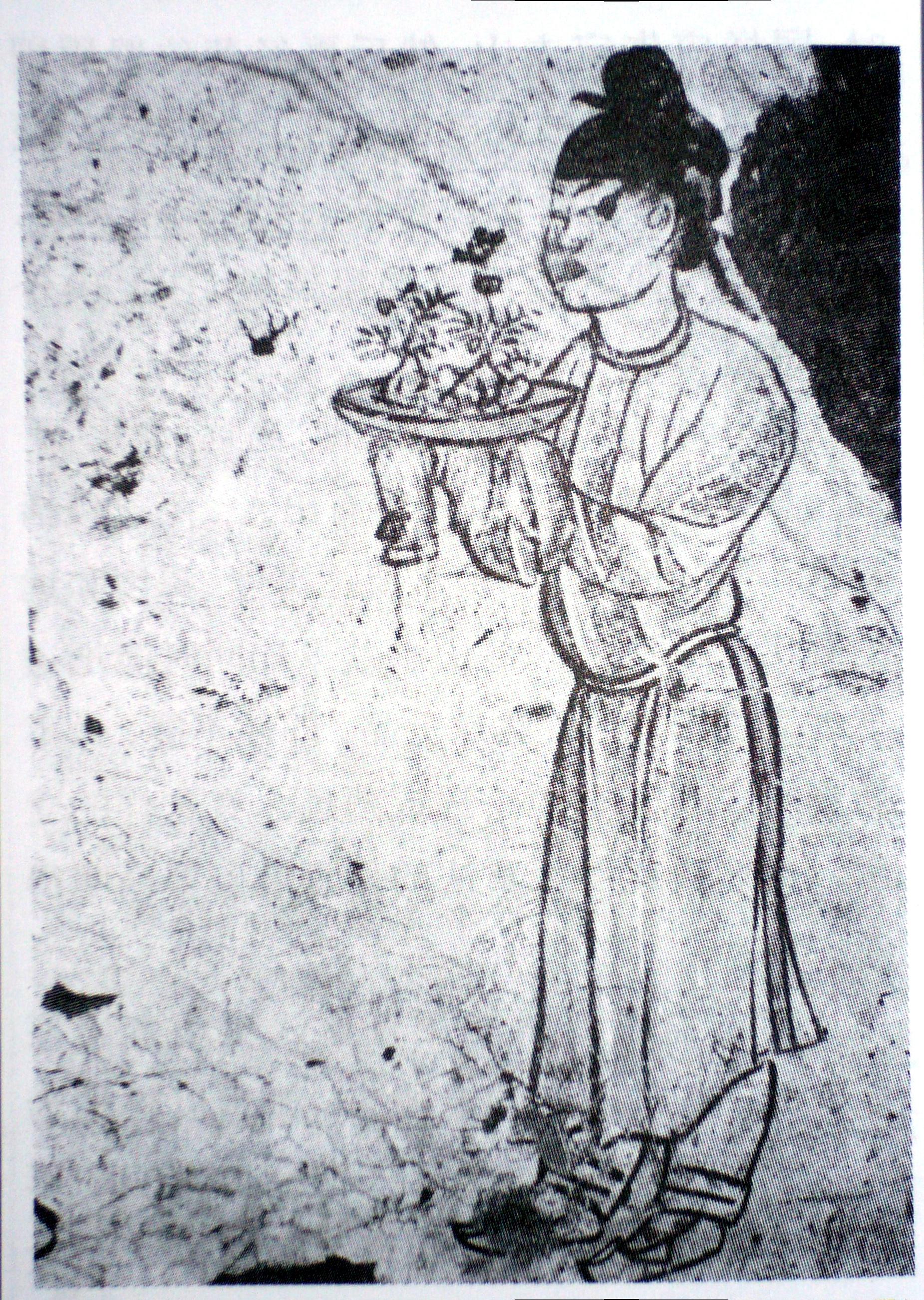
Mural from the tomb of Prince Zhanghuai (AD 706), depicting a man with tray of pebbles and miniature fruit trees

The earliest-known graphic dates from 706 and is found in a wall mural on a corridor leading to the tomb of Prince Zhang Huai at the Qianling Mausoleum site. Excavated in 1972, the frescoes show two maid servants carrying penjing with miniature rockeries and fruit trees.

The first highly prized trees are believed to have been collected in the wild and were full of twists, knots, and deformities. These were seen as sacred, of no practical profane value for timber or other ordinary purpose. These naturally dwarfed plants were held to be endowed with special concentrated energies due to age and origin away from human influence. The viewpoint of Chán Buddhism would continue to impact the creation of miniature landscapes. Smaller and younger plants which could be collected closer to civilization but still bore a resemblance to the rugged old treasures from the mountains would also have been chosen. Horticultural techniques to increase the appearance of age by emphasizing trunk, root, and branch size, texture, and shapes would eventually be employed with these specimens.

From Tang times onward, various poets and essayists praised dwarf potted landscapes. A decorative tree guild from around 1276 is known to have supplied dwarf specimens for use in Suzhou restaurants in the province of Jiangsu.

=== In Japan ===
Although imperial embassy personnel and Buddhist students from Japan had returned from the mainland with miniature landscape souvenirs since the 6th century, the oldest known depiction of a dwarfed tray landscape in Japan dates from 1309. The fifth of the twenty-scroll Kasuga-gongen-genki masterpiece depicts the household of a wealthy Japanese individual who has an outdoors slatted-workbench holding a shallow wooden tray and ceramic dish of Chinese origin with dwarf trees, grasses, and stones. By this time Chán Buddhism had been developed in Japan as Zen. Its influence of "beauty in severe austerity" led native Japanese dwarf potted landscapes to be distilled into single, ideal trees being representatives of the universe. The tradition of bonsai is believed to originate from the Chinese practice.

=== Middle years ===
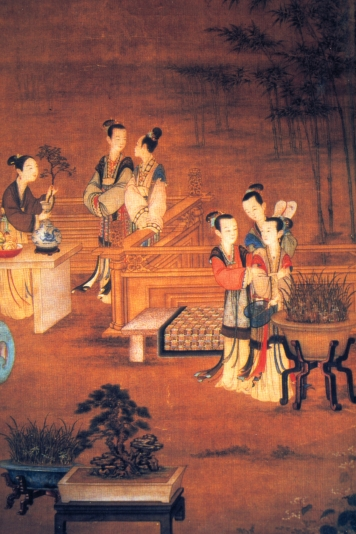
Depiction of the Ming imperial court ladies tending or standing beside penjing

Since at least the 16th century, shops at the "Garden of Dragon Flowers" (Longhua) to the southwest of Shanghai, were engaged in cultivating miniature trees in containers. (These would continue to the present day.) Meanwhile, Suzhou was still considered at century's end to be the source of the finest exponents of the art of penjing.

The earliest-known English observation of penjing in China/Macau dates from 1637.

During the end of the 18th century, Yangzhou in central Jiangsu province boasted landscape penjing that contained water and soil.

=== 19th century ===
In 1806, a very old dwarf tree from Canton (now Guangzhou) was gifted to Sir Joseph Banks and eventually presented to Queen Charlotte for Her Majesty's inspection. This tree and most others seen by Westerners in southeast China probably originated at the celebrated Fa Ti gardens near Canton.

By the first half of the 19th century, according to various Western accounts, air layering was the primary propagation method for penjing, which were then generally between one and two feet in height after two to twenty years of work. Elms were the main specimens used, along with pines, junipers, cypresses, and bamboos; plums were the favored fruit trees, along with peaches and oranges. The branches could be bent and shaped using various forms of bamboo scaffolding, twisted lead strips, and iron or brass wire to hold them in place; they could also be cut, burnt, or grafted. The bark was sometimes lacerated at places or smeared with sugary substance to induce termites ("white ants") to roughen it or even to eat the similarly sweetened heartwood. Rocks with moss or lichens were also a frequent feature of these compositions.

The earliest known photograph from China which included penjing was made c.1868 by John Thomson. He was particularly delighted by the collection in the garden of the Hoi Tong Monastery on Henan Island near Guangzhou. A collection of dwarf trees and plants from China was also exhibited that year in Brooklyn, New York. In America, laws such as the Chinese Exclusion Act led to Japanese bonsai becoming more familiar to Americans. This led to the prevalence of knowledge of the Japanese forms of dwarf potted trees for the next several decades and prior to Chinese forms.

Near the end of the 19th century, the Lingnan or Cantonese school of "Clip and Grow" styling was developed at a monastery in southeast China. Fast-growing tropical trees and shrubs could be more easily and quickly shaped using these techniques.

=== 20th-21st centuries ===
Established in 1954, the Longhua nursery in Shanghai included the teaching of classical theory and all aspects of the practice of penjing, a process which could take student-gardeners ten years.

As late as the early 1960s, it is reported that some 60 characteristic regional forms of penjing could be distinguished by the expert eye. A few of these forms dated back to at least the 16th century.

During the upheaval of the Cultural Revolution (May 1966-April 1969), one relatively small effect was that many collections of penjing in mainland China, especially around Beijing, were damaged or neglected because they were seen as a bourgeois pastime. After their trees were gone, some Chinese penjing masters, men in their sixties and seventies, were forced to do something considered socially redemptive—many were sent to fields to plant rice. However, in other areas of China, especially in eastern and southern China, penjing were collected for safe keeping.

Wu Yee-sun (1905–2005), third generation penjing master and grandson of a Lingnan school founder, held the first exhibition of artistic pot plants jointly with Mr. Liu Fei Yat in Hong Kong in 1968. This was a display of traditional aristocratic penjing which had survived the 1949 Chinese Communist Revolution by leaving/being protected from Mainland China. The two editions of Wu's Chinese/English book, Man Lung Garden Artistic Pot Plants, helped develop interest in this older form of what the West only knew as the later-refined Japanese art of bonsai.

The Yuk Sui Yuen Penzai Exhibition was held in Canton in 1978. This was the first public show in ten years with approximately 250 penjing from private collections displayed in a public park. Antique pots were also shown. The Shanghai Botanical Garden opened that year and permanently displays 3,000 penjing. The First National Penjing Show was held the following year in Beijing with over 1,100 exhibits from 13 provinces, towns, and autonomies.

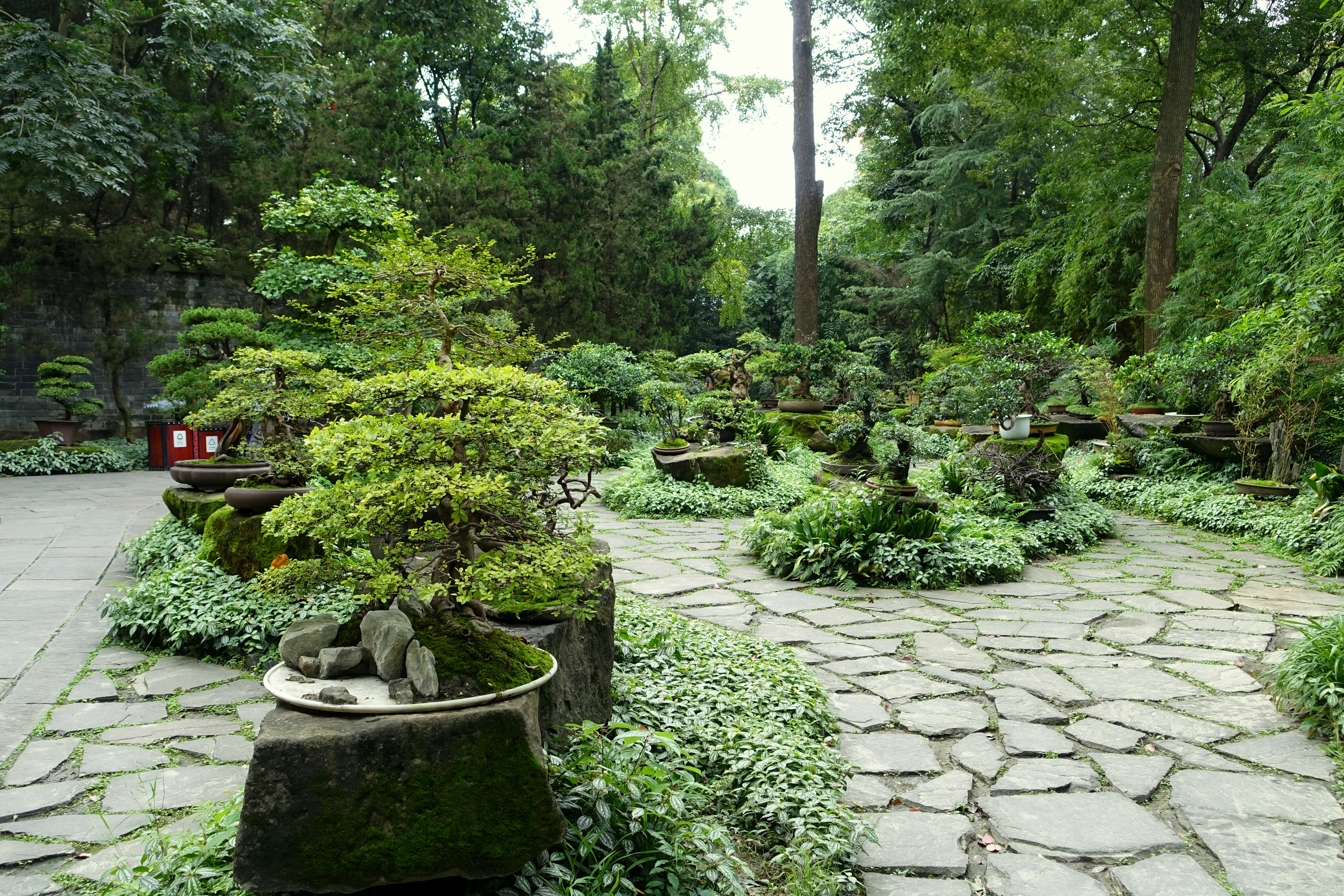
Penjing garden at the Wuhou Shrine, Chengdu, China, 2015

One division of the Hangzhou Flower Nursery by 1981 specialized in penjing, including over fifteen hundred once abandoned older specimens being maintained and in the initial stages of being retrained. The art of penjing would again become vastly popular in China, in part due to stability returning to most people's lives and the significantly improved economic conditions; growth would be most pronounced particularly in coastal provinces of Jiangsu, Zhejiang, Fujian, Guangdong as well as Shanghai. There would be increasing numbers of good public and private collections, the latter with anywhere from several hundred to several thousand pieces.

By the end of 1981, the China Flower and Penjing Association was formed, and seven years later the China Penjing Artists Association was likewise established.

The Hong Kong Baptist University opened the Man Lung Garden in 2000 to promote the Chinese heritage of penjing. Temporarily located on the university's Shaw Campus, in February 2005 a permanent site was set up at the Kam Shing Road Entrance of its Ho Sin Hang Campus.

== Aesthetics ==
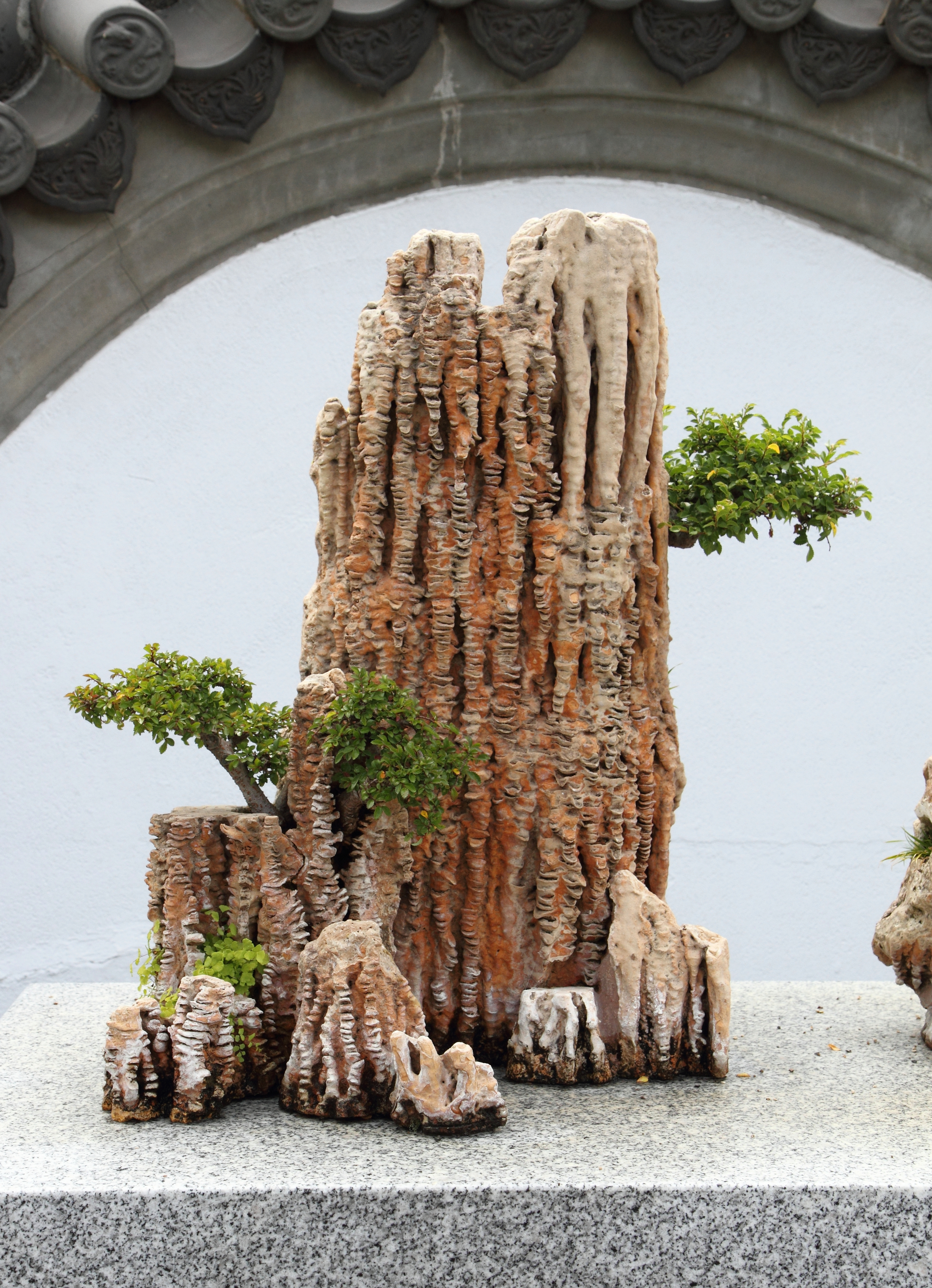
Penjing style presenting contrast of trees on a rocky landscape

Using artificially dwarfed trees and shrubs, these arrangements are created in special trays or pots which are placed on ornately carved wooden stands. Often, rocks, miniature ceramic structures (like buildings and bridges), and figurines are added to give the proper scales as part of the natural scenery. These miniatures add to the symbolism of a penjing specimen, by providing a social or historical context in which to interpret the overall penjing design.

These miniature landscapes include trees which are frequently over a hundred years old. Like the plants in the Chinese garden, they have been carefully selected and tended so that they develop into twisted and gnarled shapes reminiscent of their full-size counterparts in the wild. Like Chinese gardens, these miniature landscapes are designed to convey landscapes experienced from various viewpoints - a close-up view, a medium-range view or a panorama.

As an art form, penjing is an extension of the garden, since it enables an artist to recreate parts of the natural landscape in miniature. Penjing is often used indoors as part of a garden's overall design, since it reiterates the landscape features found outside. Penjing pots grace pavilions, private studies or living rooms, and public buildings. They are either free-standing elements within the gardens or are placed on furniture such as a table or bookshelf. Sometimes a lattice display stand is built which adds particular prominence to the penjing specimen and exemplifies the interplay between architecture and nature.

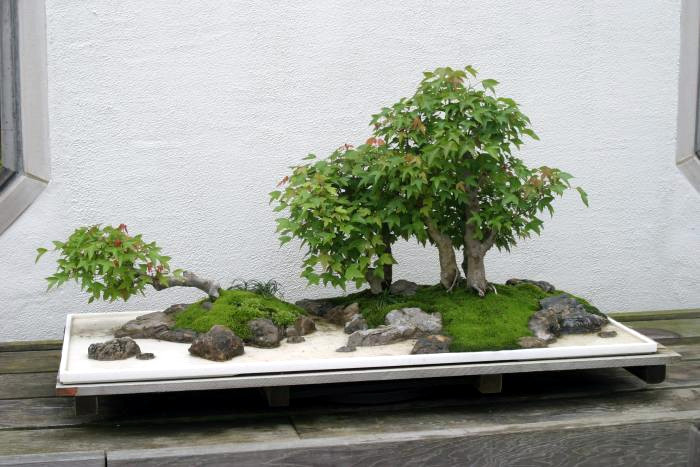
A specimen in the landscape penjing style

Penjing seeks to capture the essence and spirit of nature through contrasts. Philosophically, it is influenced by the principles of Taoism, specifically the concept of Yin and Yang: the idea of the universe as governed by two primal forces, opposing but complementary. Some of the contrasting concepts used in penjing include portrayal of "dominance and subordination, emptiness (void) and substance, denseness and sparseness, highness and lowness, largeness and smallness, life and death, dynamics and statics, roughness and meticulousness, firmness and gentleness, lightness and darkness, straightness and curviness, verticality and horizontality, and lightness and heaviness."

Design inspiration is not limited to observation or representation of nature, but is also influenced by Chinese poetry, calligraphy, and other visual arts. Common penjing designs include evocation of dragons and the strokes of well-omened characters. At its highest level, the artistic value of penjing is on par with that of poetry, calligraphy, brush painting and garden art.

== Styles ==
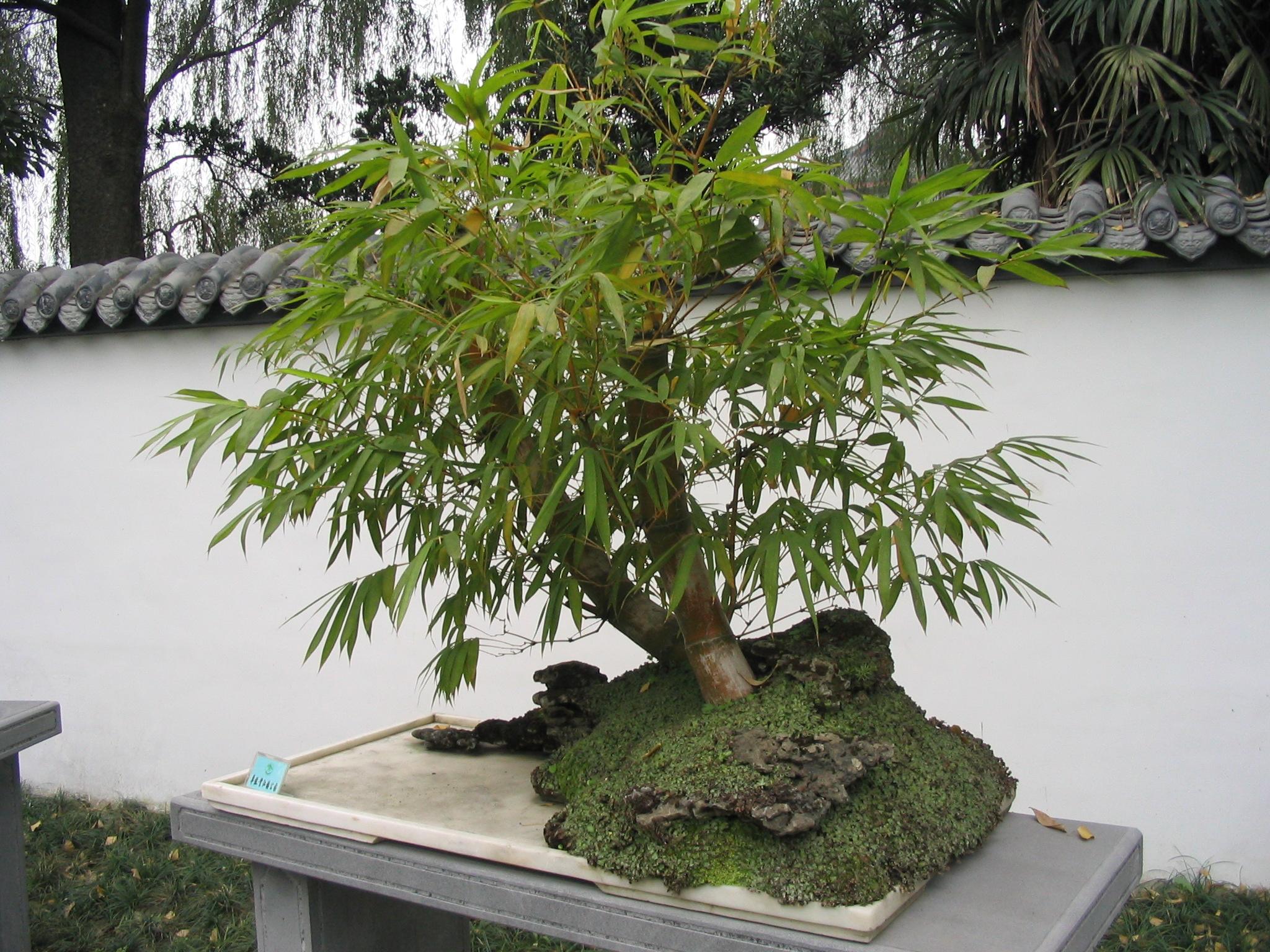
Bamboo penjing in Chengdu, China

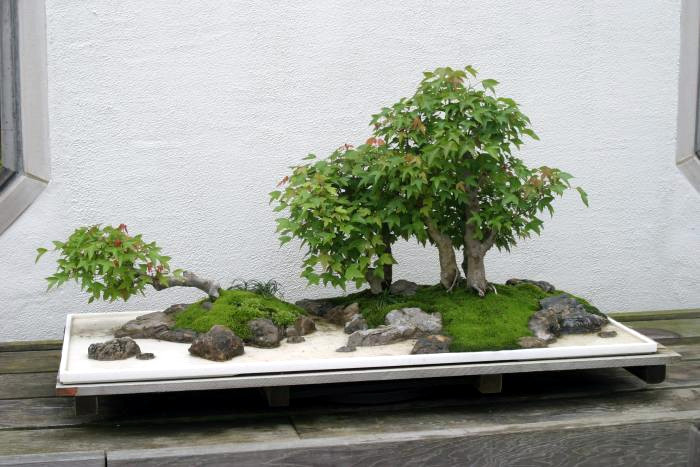
Penjing in the US National Bonsai and Penjing Museum

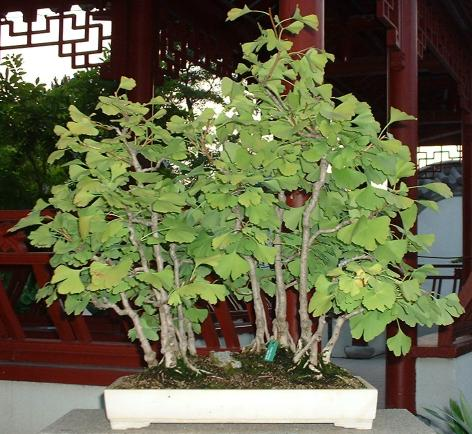
Ginkgo penjing

Styles of the traditional Penjing in China are mainly classified by the most representative (dominant) plants used, and named after the regions of their origin. Since different plants require different techniques to handle, different styles thus formed. There are more than a dozen styles of traditional Penjing:

Anhui Style
Anhui Penjing (徽派盆景) is most famous for its utilization of ume.

Beijing Style
Beijing Penjing (京派盆景) reflects its artistic origin from the ancient traditional Chinese architecture in Beijing. The branches are often horizontal and the crowns of the trees are often in hemisphere or in the form of traditional folding fan.

Guangdong (or Lingnan) Style
Cantonese penjing (Jyutping: Jyut^{6} paai^{3} pun^{4} ging^{2}; Traditional Chinese: 粵派盆景) is also called Lingnan ("South of the (Nan)ling Range") penjing (嶺南派盆景), because Guangdong is located south of the Nanling mountain range. The main characteristic of this style is its natural appeal and the appeal of easy and smooth.

Guangxi Style
Guangxi Penjing (桂派盆景) reflect the beautiful natural landscape such as that of Guilin. This style utilizes different type of stones considerably more frequent than other styles.

Fujian Style
Fujian Penjing (閩派盆景) specializes in utilization of banyan.

Hubei Style
Hubei Penjing (湖北盆景) emphasizes on the producing the sense of dynamic feelings by the static plants and rocks, and thus also called Dynamic Penjing (动势盆景).

Jiangsu Style
Like the culinary art of the Jiangsu cuisine, the art of Jiangsu Penjing (蘇派盆景) is also complicated, with the crowns of the trees often being shaped like clouds.

Sichuan Style
Sichuan Penjing (川派盆景) tends to be well-knit, simple and unsophisticated.

Shanghai Style
Shanghai Penjing (海派盆景) has influenced the Japanese bonsai, but at the same time, has kept its original artistic origin, which is from the traditional Chinese painting.

Taiwan Style
Taiwan Penjing (臺灣盆景) is a cross of Japanese bonsai and traditional Chinese Penjing.

Xuzhou Style
Xuzhou Penjing (徐州盆景) is a branch of Jiangsu style, but it is distinct enough to be listed separately for hundreds of years for its utilization of fruit trees.

Yangzhou Style
Yangzhou Penjing (揚派盆景) is also called northern Jiangsu style (蘇北派), it is distinct from Jiangsu style The three twists of tree trunks is the most distinctive characteristic of this style.

Yunnan Style
Yunnan Penjing (雲南盆景) benefits from the extreme climatic and biodiversity of Yunnan region, between the Himalayas and the tropics. A permanent display of Yunnan style penjing is visible at Daguan Park, Kunming.

Zhejiang Style
Zhejiang Penjing (浙派盆景) specializes in utilization of pine and cypress, often have three to five plants in one tray.

Zhongzhou Style
Zhongzhou Penjing (中州盆景) specializes in utilizing Tamarix.

== Maintenance and care ==
The maintenance and care of penjing trees are similar to that of the bonsai.

== See also ==
- Chinese garden
- Gongshi - Chinese scholar's rock
- Bonsai - Japanese art of growing trees in trays
- Saikei - Japanese living tray landscapes
- Bonkei - Japanese dry tray landscapes
- Hòn non bộ - Vietnamese art of making miniature landscapes
- List of organic gardening and farming topics
- National Bonsai Foundation
