= Kokan Shiren =

Japanese Rinzai Zen patriarch and poet

- 虎関師錬
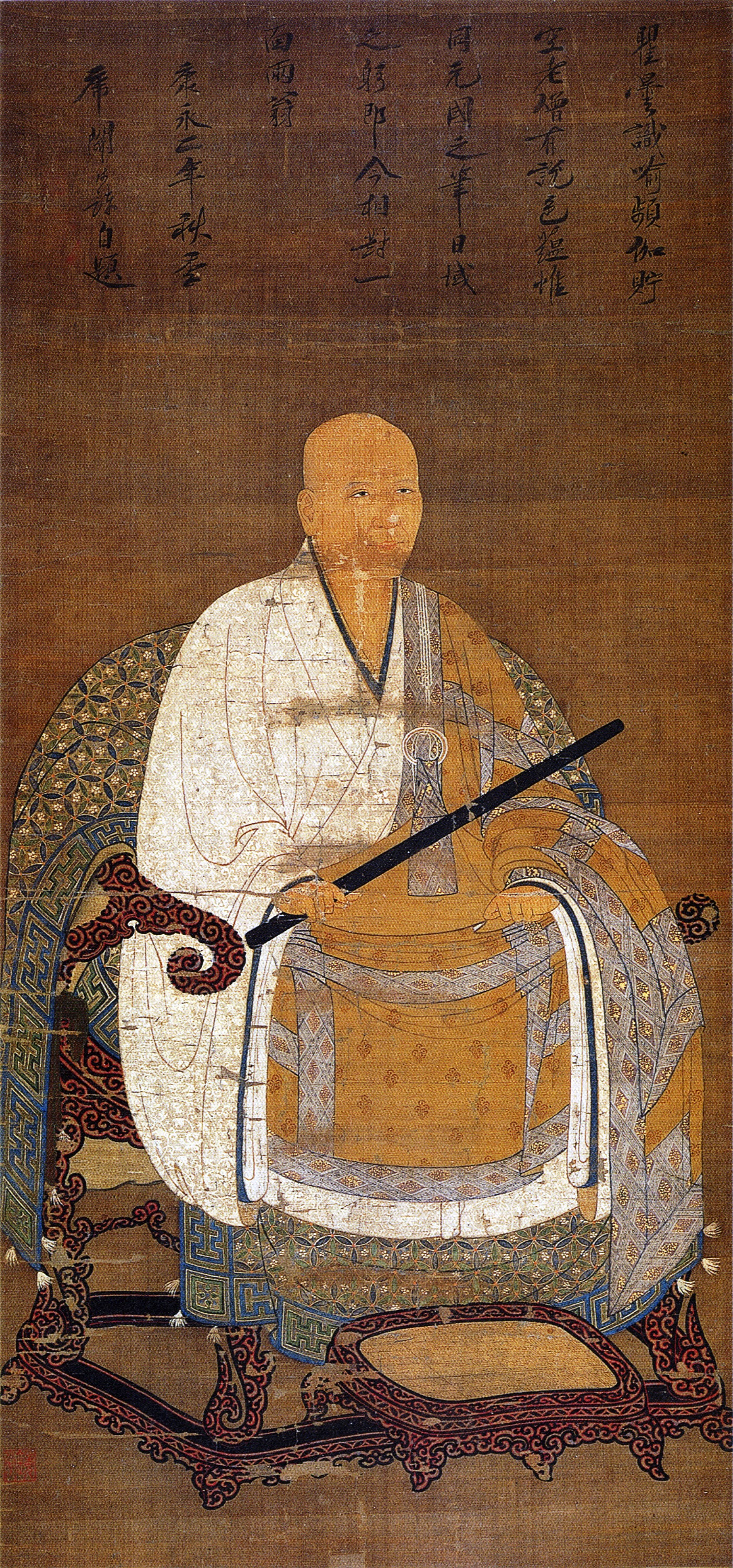
- Title: Kokushi (本覚国師)

Personal life
- Born: May 9, 1278 Kyoto, Japan
- Died: August 11, 1347 (aged 69) Tōfuku-ji, Kyoto

Religious life
- Religion: Buddhism
- School: Rinzai

Kokan Shiren (虎関師錬; 9 May 1278 – 11 August 1347), Japanese Rinzai Zen patriarch and celebrated poet. He preached Buddhism at the Imperial court, and was noted for his poetry in the Literature of the Five Mountains (Gozan bungaku) tradition. He was the compiler of a thirty-chapter Buddhist history, the Genko Shakusho, the oldest extant account of Buddhism in Japan.

== Biography ==
Kokan was the son of an officer of the palace guard and a mother of the aristocratic Minamoto clan. At age eight he was placed in the charge of the Buddhist priest Hōkaku on Mt. Hiei. At age ten he was ordained there, but later began study with the Zen master Kian at the Nanzenji monastery. Kokan Shiren's talents came to the attention of the Emperor Kameyama. At age seventeen he began extensive Chinese studies. Thus began a long career of travel and the establishment of Zen institutions all across Japan. He became abbot at many of the best Zen establishments. At the end of his life, the emperor Gomurakami conferred upon him the title kokushi or National Teacher. Yet in his writings Kokan showed an aloofness from prestige with a striving for inner freedom. The best of his poetry in Chinese dates from late in his life when he had withdrawn from ecclesiastical affairs. His poetry and essays were collected under the title Saihokushū. He is also credited with other contributions to lexography in his lifetime.

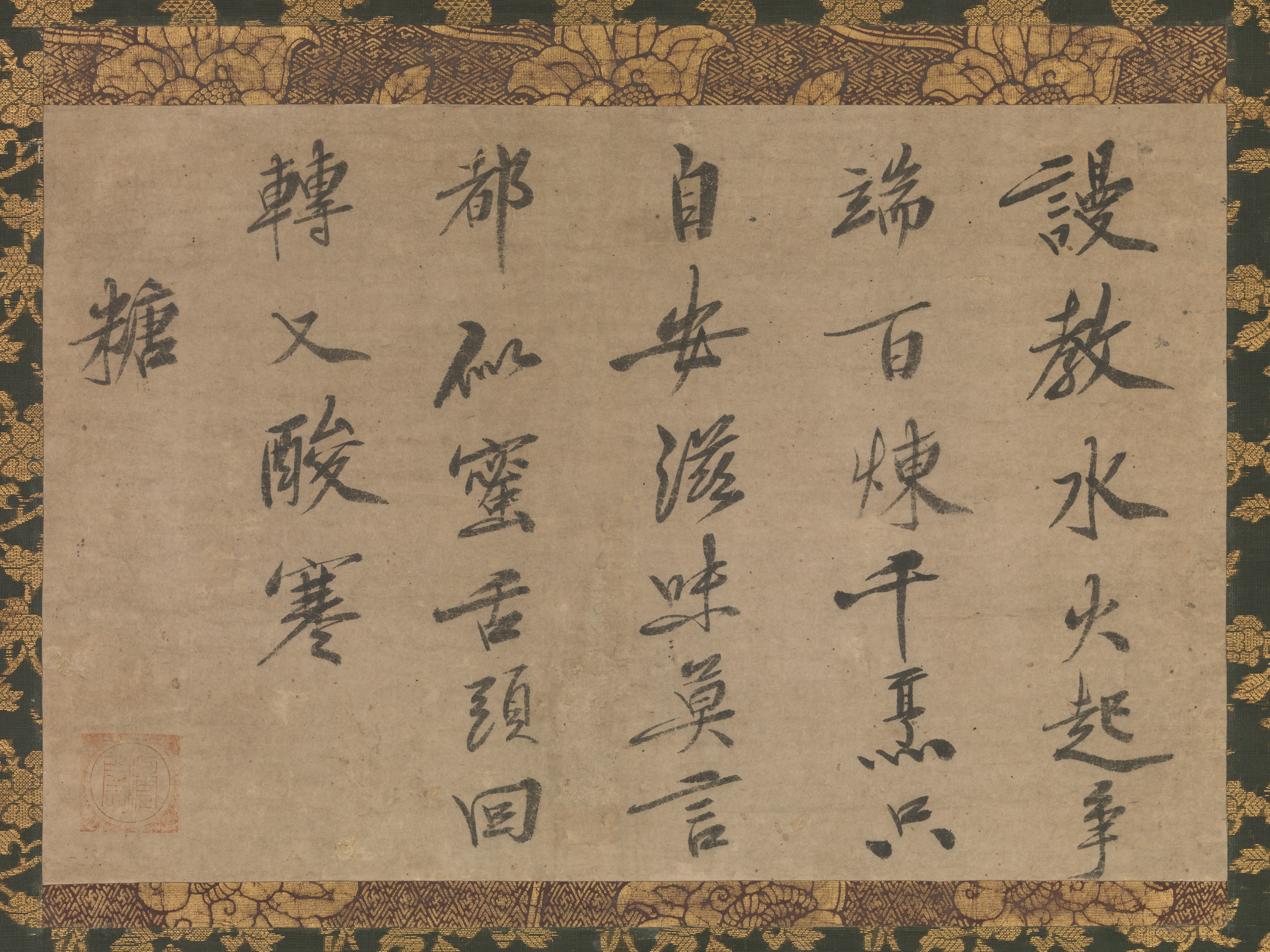
A poem and calligraphy in Chinese by Kokan

Kokan studied under the celebrated Chinese monk Yishan Yining. Their relationship can be regarded as the beginning of the golden age of the Literature of the Five Mountains in Japan. He studied calligraphy under an additional Chinese master Huang Shangu. Other works include Japan's first rhymed verse Jubun-in-ryaku in five volumes, Kokan Osho Juzenshiroku in three volumes, and the eighteen-volume Butsugo Shinron. A portrait of Kokan Shiren is in the Kaizoin of the Tōfuku-ji Temple in Kyoto, Japan.

Kokan is noted for writing the Genko Shakusho, the oldest extant account of Buddhism in Japan. In the introduction to the work, Kokan wrote that he was shamed into writing it after the Chinese monk Yishan Yining expressed his surprise that no such history existed in Japan. In 1322, he completed the Genko Shakusho; it was completed in the Genko era, whence the era name in its title.

== Rhymeprose on a Miniature Landscape Garden ==
Of great interest for the development of the Japanese garden, bonseki, bonsai and related arts is Kokan Shirens rhymeprose essay Rhymeprose on a Miniature Landscape Garden. Obvious influence can be seen from Chinese Song period literati. Kokan Shiren's deceptively simple and straightforward narration gave an early voice to what would become a profound cultural transformation in Japan:

What I liked to do for fun when I was a child was to gather up sacks of stones and pile them on a table near the window high and free. When I reached middle age, I felt ashamed of doing this and so I stopped, becoming like any other ordinary person, obtuse like a brick. Finally, I have reached decrepit old age, and I particularly dislike the sound of children’s games in the summer. So I had the children gather up stones in the corner of the wall. I brushed them off and washed them, preparing a green celadon tray with white sand on the bottom. The result was poetry that would lighten your heart. The landscape lent a coolness to the air and dispelled the heart.

A visitor saw it and exclaimed, “Okay, okay, but it seems a little bald, doesn’t it?”

I responded, “You see a pile of stones and fail to see the mountains. The marvelous thing about miniature landscape gardens is that they are imitations of mountains and streams. The base is made to look flowing waves and the cliffs are made to seem covered with vegetation. Sometimes you can see miniature gnarled pine or knobby plum. You might see unusual blossoms or strange new shoots from their trimmed branches. Of course you will discover the utter vexation of your creations withering and wilting due to carelessness of slow watering and tending. If you fail to exert yourself, then you will simply fail to fashion a magnificent mountain and a smaller world among the smaller mounds and hills.

“Years ago I climbed to the top of Mt. Fuji. The climb took three days. For two days I passed through areas of great trees and forests, but on the third morning there wasn’t a blade of grass to be seen! At that point there were only great boulder-like cliffs and purplish-red stones. It was like this for a number of miles until I reached the peak itself. Of course Mt. Fuji is not unique in this respect as all peaks are without vegetation. People who climb mountains do not dislike the so-called baldness; rather, the love the sense of height.

“These stones then, just a number of inches tall, and this tray roughly a foot across, they are nothing short of a mountainous island rising from the sea! Jade-green peaks penetrate the clouds and are encircled by them. A blue-green barrier, immersed in water, is standing straight up. There are caves as if carved in the cliff sides to hide saints and immortals. Jetties and spits flat enough and long enough for fishermen. The paths and roads are narrow and confined, yet woodcutters can pass along them. There are lagoons deep and dark enough to hide dragons.

“So is it not fitting that I guard against weeds, carefully watching and laboring over the thing, taking delight in its total subtlety? Do you dislike the baldness of the small mounds and hills? Am I oblivious to the bareness of just the peak? I sometimes pick a flowering branch and place it in a peak or in a ravine. The alternations of plant life, their blooming in the morning and fading in the evening, are the splendor of the four seasons with their countless transformations and myriad changes! So therefore I say that it doesn’t have to be bare, and it does not have to be lush.

“Another thing, do you think this miniature landscape is big? Do you think it is small? I will blow on the water and raise up billows from the four seas. I will water the peak and send down a torrent from the ninth heaven! The person who waters the stones sets the cosmos in order. The one who changes the water turns the whole sea upside down. Those are the changes in nature which attain a oneness in my mind. Anyway, the relative size of things is an uncertain business. Why, there is a vast plain on a fly’s eyelash and whole nations in a snail’s horn, a Chinese philosopher has told us. Well what do you think?”

My visitor got up from his seat and made his excuses. He saw that these stones purified my senses and purified my intellect. He realized that events are really not what they seemed and yet they enriched me. I told him that he only understood what he perceived with his own eyes and did not understand my point of view at all. I asked if he wouldn’t like to sit for a while longer and study the matter afresh. He said he would, but there were no waves for him. He said nothing more and I was silent. After a while my visitor left without another word.

— Saihokushu, ch. 1, pp. 1–2.

== See also ==
- List of Rinzai Buddhists
