= Bonseki =

Japanese art form using sand and small rocks

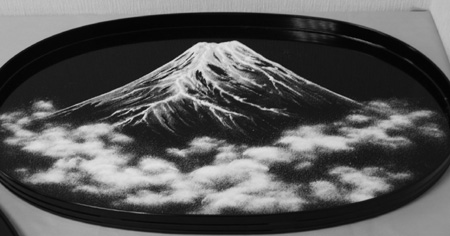

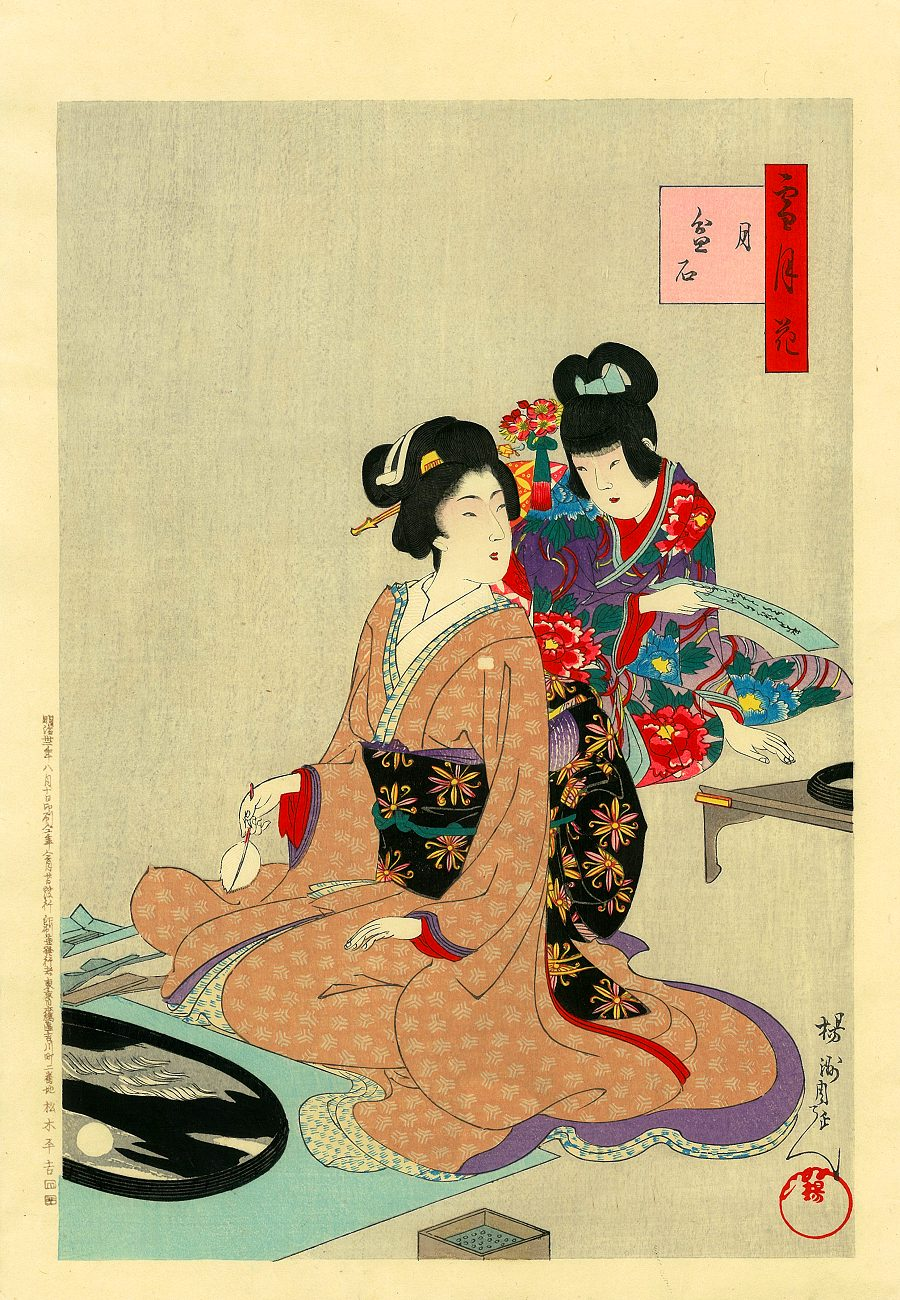
A woman making a tray landscape showing the full moon. Ukiyo-e woodblock print by Yōshū Chikanobu, 1899

Bonseki (盆石, "tray rocks") is the ancient Japanese art of creating miniature landscapes on black trays using white sand, pebbles, and small rocks.

Small delicate tools are used in Bonseki such as feathers, small flax brooms, sifters, spoons and wood wedges. The trays are either oval or rectangular, measuring about 60 by 35 centimeters in size. Oval trays have a low rim while rectangular ones are flat.

Bonseki scenes often depict mountains, seashores, and gardens. Small stones are used to represent mountains, shore lines or rocky islands that waves break upon. Miniature structures, usually of painted copper, are sometimes added to the work to make houses, temples, bridges, and the like.

Bonseki scenes by design are generally meant to only be temporary. Sometimes, by using special methods, a Bonseki scene can be preserved. This is called either bonga ("tray picture") or suna-e ("sand picture").

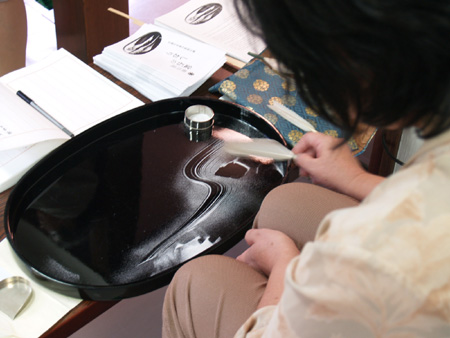

== History ==
The origins of Bonseki are unclear but it is believed Emperor Tenmu, who reigned in the mid-7th Century, made use of Bonseki techniques to describe natural objects and landscapes. It is also believed that a number of gardens in Kyoto were planned and designed with the use of Bonseki as a type of temporary blueprint.

The rhymeprose essay, Rhymeprose on a Miniature Landscape Garden, written around 1300 by the Japanese Zen monk Kokan Shiren, outlines the aesthetic principles for bonseki and garden architecture itself. Under the aesthetically minded Shogun Ashikaga Yoshimasa (1443–1490), Bonseki became popular among members of the aristocracy. A century later, Sen no Rikyū, the famed master of the tea ceremony, practised Bonseki and one of his students, Hosokawa Sansai, set up a school dedicated to Bonseki with established techniques. The Edo period (1603–1867) saw many Bonseki schools set up as it gained in popularity. Bonseki was particularly popular with many ladies of the Shogunate court in old Tokyo.

With the restoration of Imperial rule, Bonseki declined sharply as more emphasis was placed on modernity and Western culture.

== Modern revival ==
In recent times, Bonseki has seen some revival as new groups continue to improve upon the Hosokawa techniques, while preserving its traditional elegance. One such group is the Tokyo Kuyo-Kai of the Hosokawa School. The Tokyo Kuyo-Kai is a group of students of the late headmasters of the Hosokawa school.

According to the Tokyo Kuyo-Kai group the object of Bonseki is not in the completion of the scene itself, nor in its preservation. The Tokyo Kuyo-Kai states: "The importance of Bonseki is the peaceful feeling and satisfaction you derive from creating a Bonseki scene and not the result of the work."

== See also ==
- Sandpainting
- Rhymeprose on a Miniature Landscape Garden
- Suiseki
