= Rock garden =

Garden landscaped with rock features

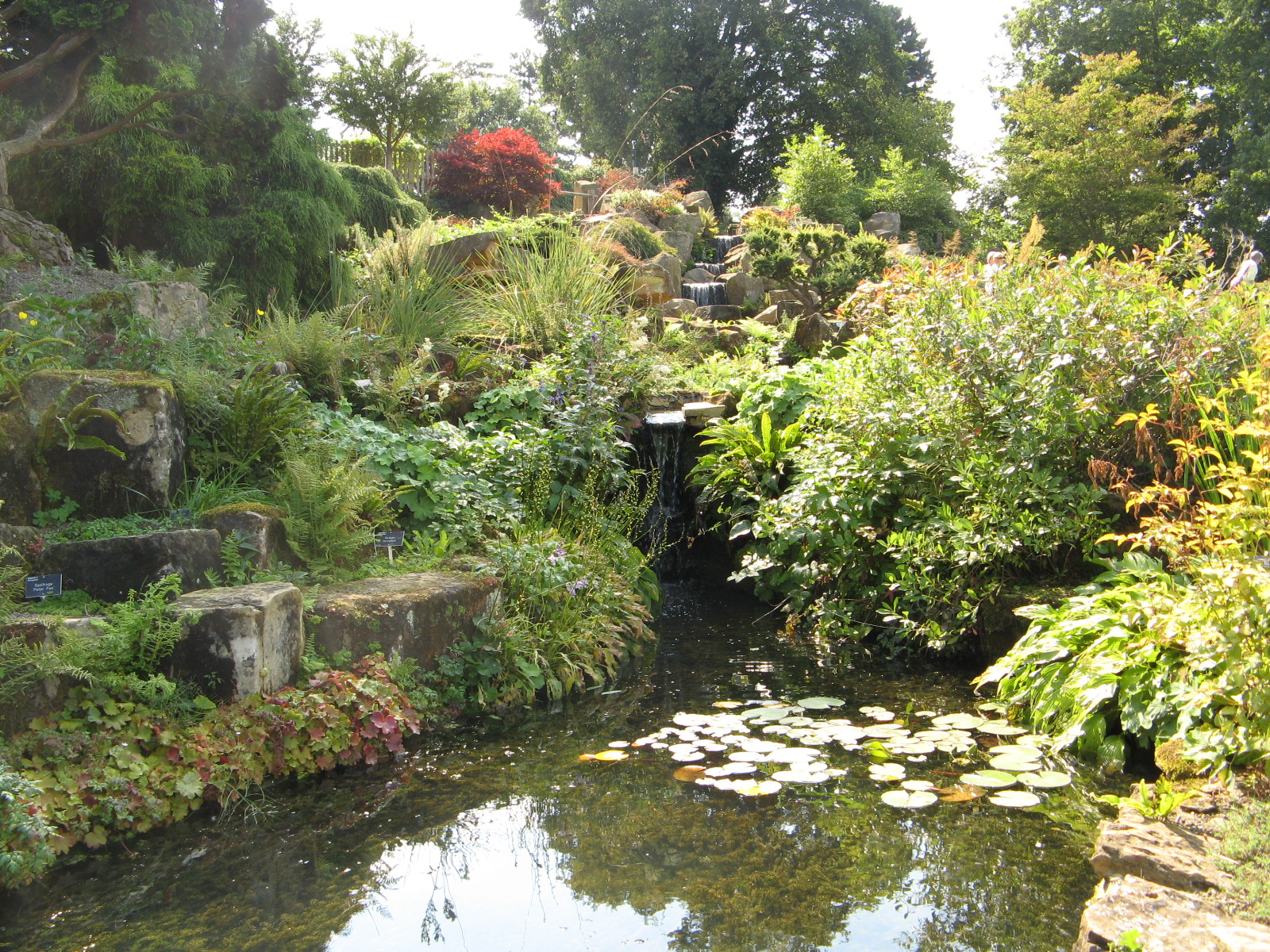
Pool in the rock garden at RHS Wisley, wholly artificial and constructed in the 1920s.

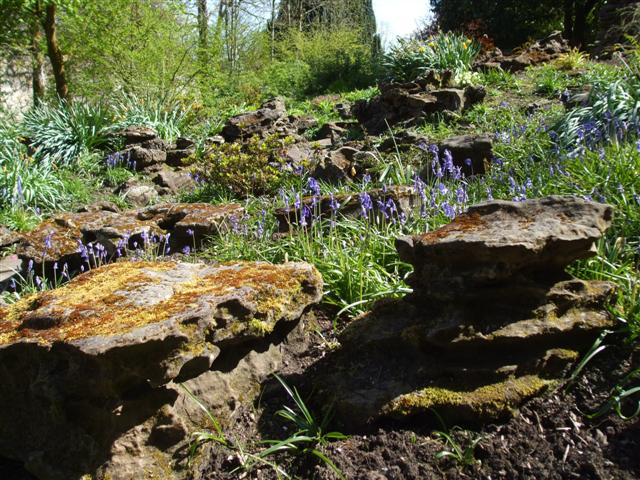
Rock garden, Castle Archdale. These jagged rocks are typical of some parts of the lough shore. People used to transport them away for a feature for their gardens.

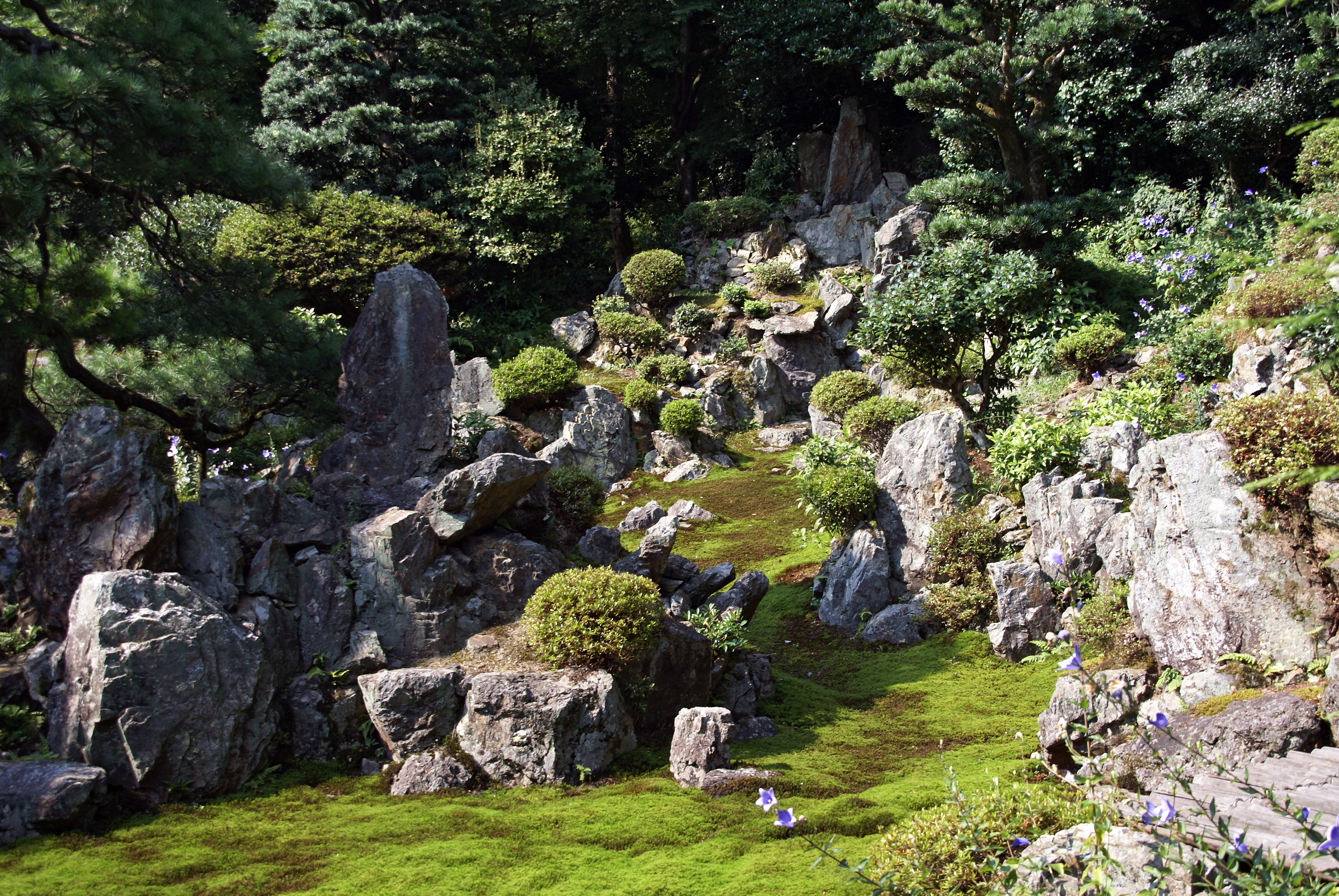
Seiganji in Maibara, Shiga prefecture, Japan

A rock garden, also known as a rockery and formerly as a rockwork, is a garden, or more often a part of a garden, with a landscaping framework of rocks, stones, and gravel, with planting appropriate to this setting. Usually these are small Alpine plants that need relatively little soil or water. Western rock gardens are often divided into alpine gardens, scree gardens on looser, smaller stones, and other rock gardens.

Some rock gardens are planted around natural outcrops of rock, perhaps with some artificial landscaping, but most are entirely artificial, with both rocks and plants brought in. Some are designed and built to look like natural outcrops of bedrock. Stones are aligned to suggest a bedding plane, and plants are often used to conceal the joints between said stones. This type of rockery was popular in Victorian times and usually created by professional landscape architects. The same approach is sometimes used in commercial or modern-campus landscaping but can also be applied in smaller private gardens.

The Japanese rock garden, or dry garden, often referred to as a "Zen garden", is a special kind of rock garden with a few large rocks, and gravel over most of the surface, often raked in patterns, and no or very few plants. Other Chinese and Japanese gardens use rocks, singly or in groups, with more plants, and often set in grass, or next to flowing water.

Until the fairly recent past the removal for gardening purposes of both plants and stone from their natural wild locations has resulted in considerable problems, and many are now legally protected; English Westmorland limestone pavement is one example.

== History ==
The use of rocks as decorative and symbolic elements in gardens can be traced back at least 1,500 years in Chinese and Japanese gardens. In China, large scholar's rocks, preferably soft rocks such as limestone worn in river beds or waterfalls into fantastic shapes, were transported long distances to imperial and elite gardens. Suseok are the Korean equivalent; the smaller Japanese suiseki are normally for indoor display.

Initially European artificial rockeries did not attempt to mimic natural scenes, and used exotic minerals such as feldspars, lava, and shells, with the plants chosen without a programme, though often including ferns. They were created in a similar spirit to the fashionable shell grotto. This phase lasted from the late 17th century into the early 19th.

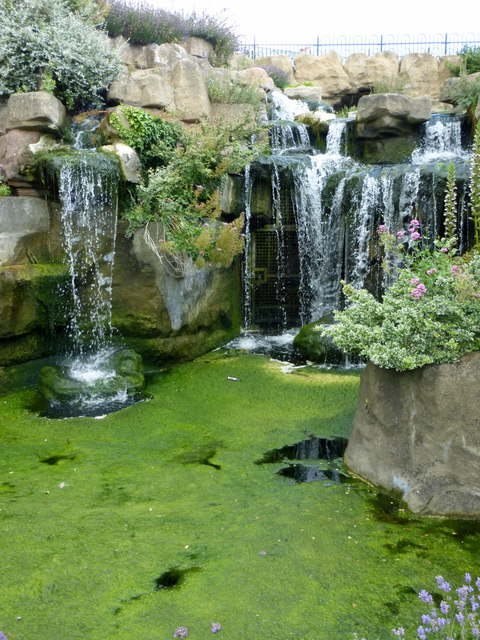
Pulhamite waterfall in Albion Place Gardens, Ramsgate

During the Golden Age of Botany (early 1700s – mid-1800s), there was widespread interest in exotic plants imported to England and other European countries. Rock gardens dedicated to growing alpine plants came to prominence in England from about the 1830s, and soon became a considerable craze. Firms could supply complete rockeries, at great expense. Initially many used artificial stone or concrete, sometimes painted, but "authentic" weathered stone came to be preferred. Pulhamite was a successful material, produced by the leading firm James Pulham and Son.

Although others had previously written about growing alpine plants, a major work was Reginald Farrer's 1919 publication of his two-volume book, The English Rock Garden. When quarrymen threw rocks at her during events campaigning for votes for women, British suffragette Norah Balls picked the stones up and put them in her bag to take home to add to her rockery.

Rock gardens have become increasingly popular as landscape features in tropical countries such as Thailand. The combination of wet weather and heavy shade trees, along with the use of heavy plastic liners to stop unwanted plant growth, has made this type of arrangement ideal for both residential and commercial gardens due to its easier maintenance and drainage.

== Layouts ==
The standard layout for a rock garden consists of a pile of aesthetically arranged rocks in different sizes, with small gaps between in which plants are rooted. Typically, plants found in rock gardens are small and do not grow larger than 1 meter in height, though small trees and shrubs up to 6 meters may be used to create a shaded area for a woodland rock garden. If used, they are often grown in troughs or low to the ground to avoid obscuring the eponymous rocks. The plants found in rock gardens are usually species that flourish in well-drained, soil.

== Image gallery ==
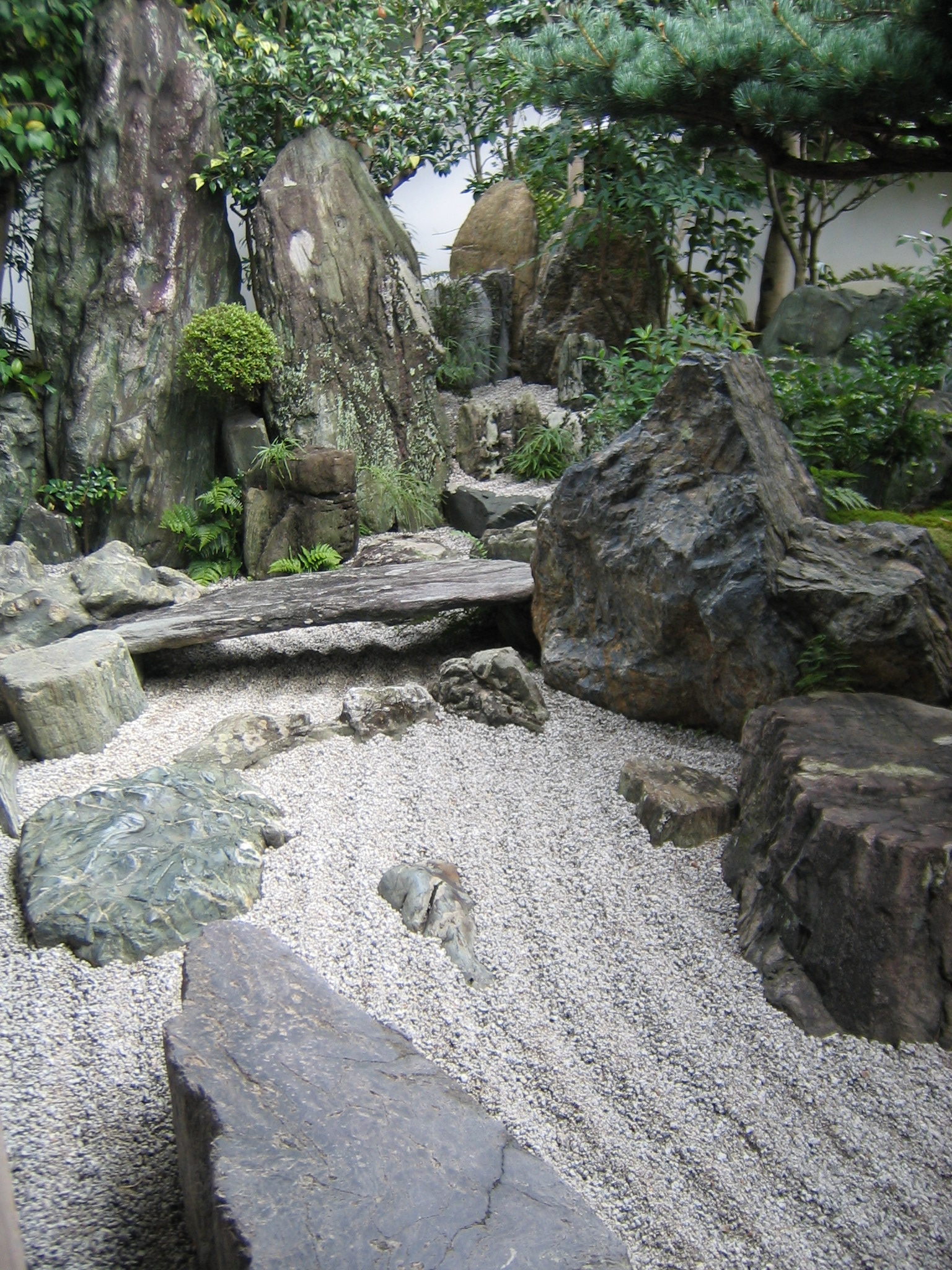
Japanese rock garden, A mountain, waterfall, and gravel "river" at Daisen-in (1509–1513)

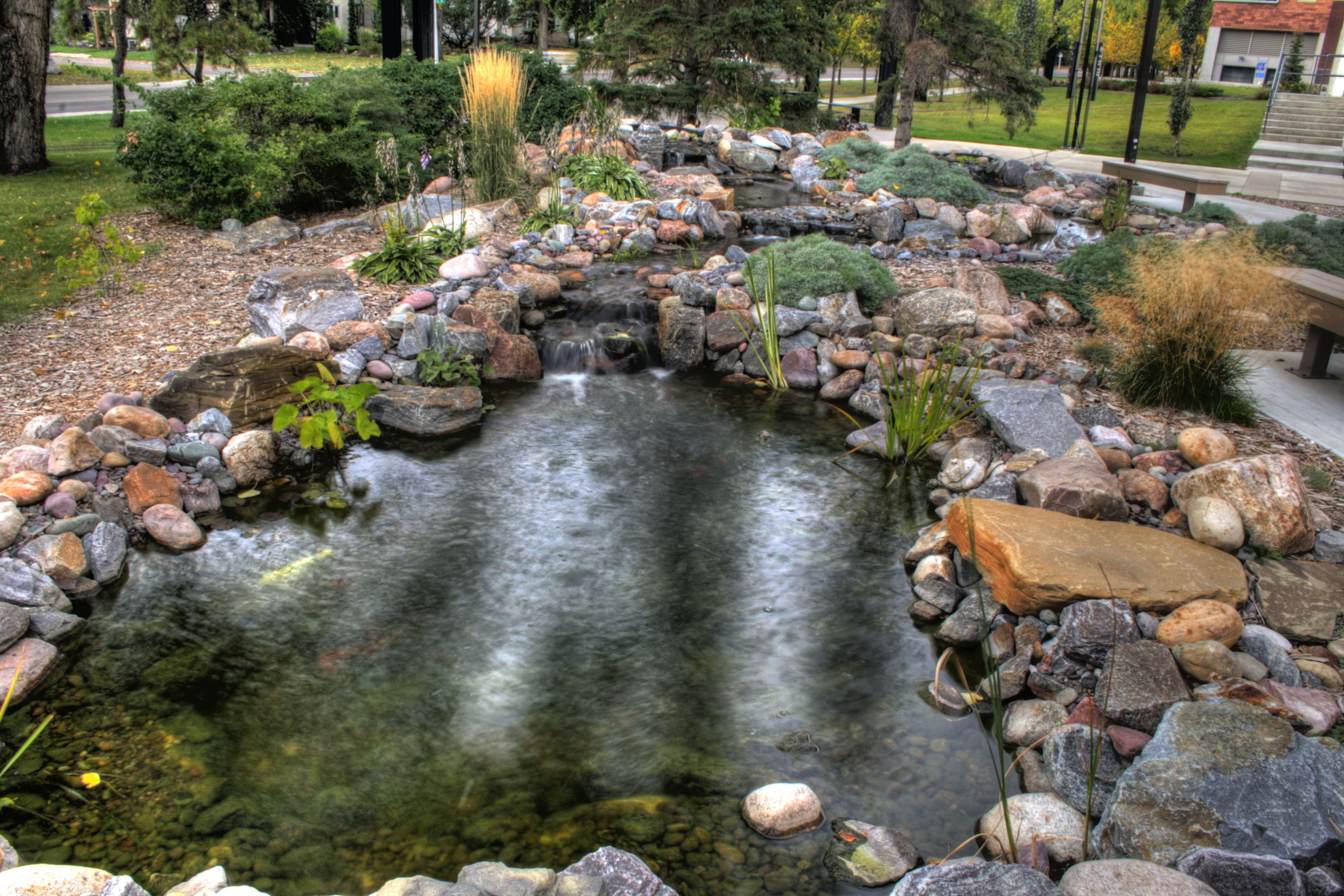
Pool in rock garden on the campus of University of Alberta, Edmonton, Canada.

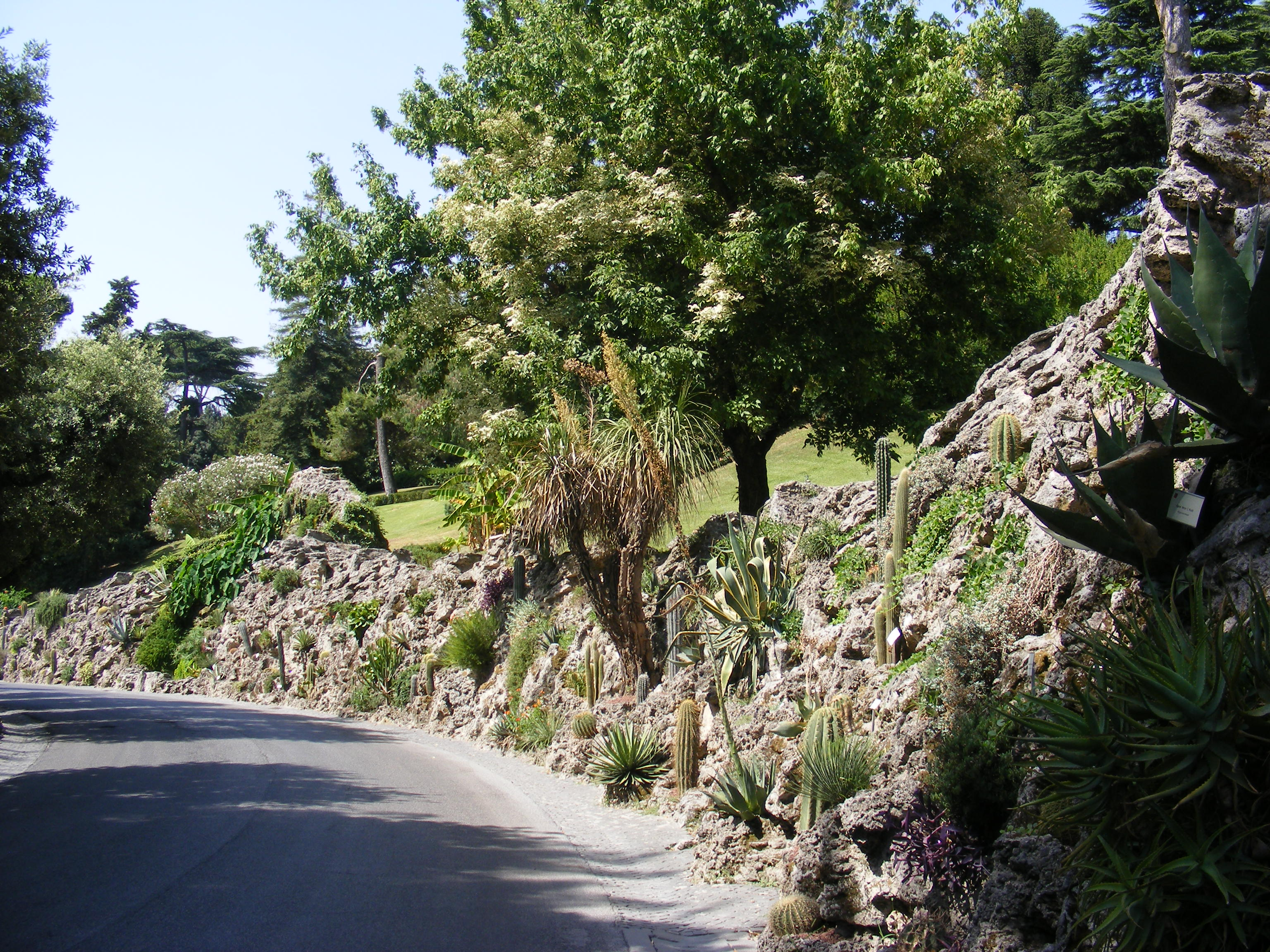
In Vatican City, with succulents.

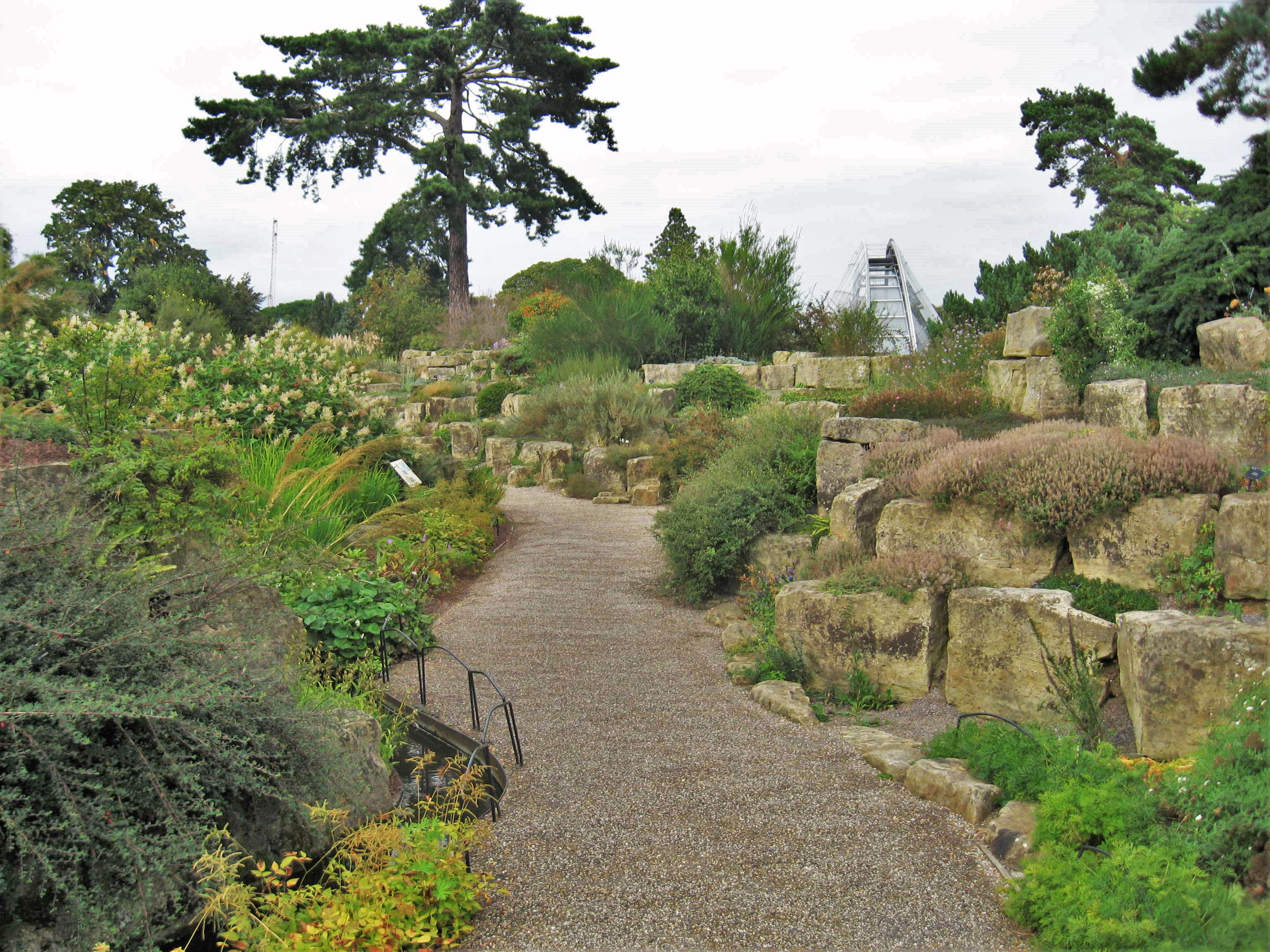
Kew Rock garden, Kew Gardens, London.

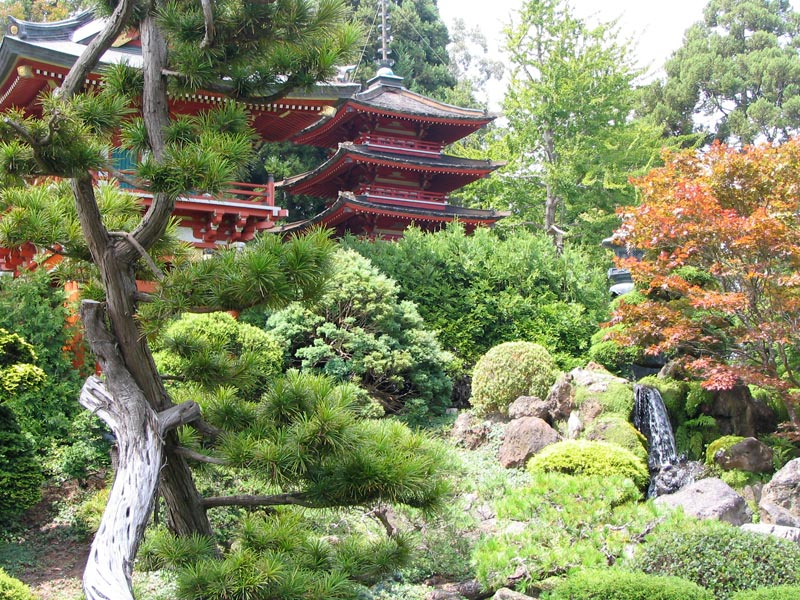
Hagiwara Japanese Tea Garden, a tea garden in San Francisco.

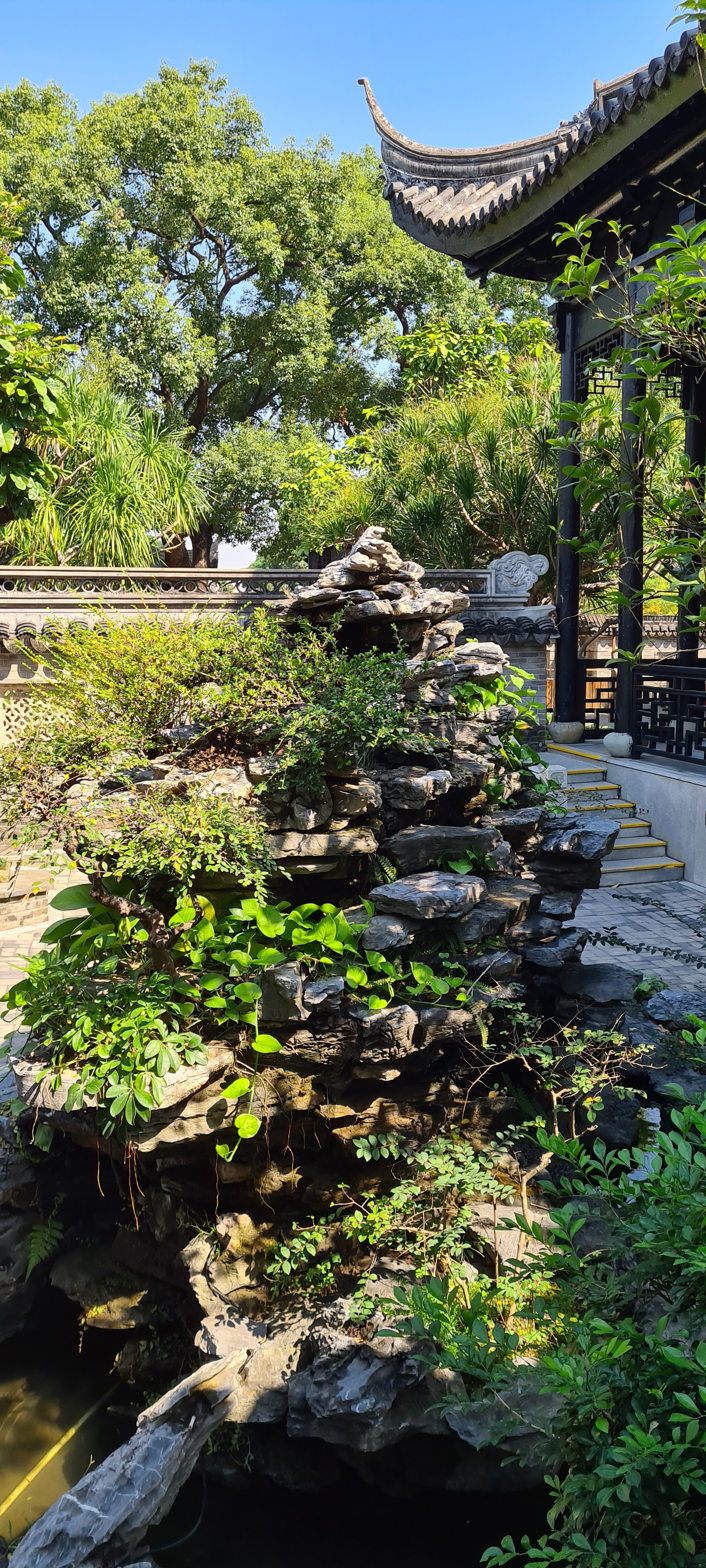
Lingnan-style rockery at Zhan Yuan, Guangdong.

== See also ==
- List of garden types
- Rock Garden, Chandigarh in Chandigarh, India
- Nek Chand, creator of the Rock Garden in Chandigarh, India.
- Chasmophyte
