= Confucian culture =

Confucian culture may refer to:

- Confucian art
- Confucianism
