= Confucian art =

Art inspired by Confucius and his teachings

Confucian art is art inspired by the writings of Confucius, and Confucian teachings. Confucian art originated in China, then spread westwards on the Silk Road, southward down to southern China and then onto Southeast Asia, and eastwards through northern China on to Japan and Korea. While it still maintains a strong influence within Indonesia, Confucian influence on western art has been limited. While Confucian themes enjoyed representation in Chinese art centers, they are fewer in comparison to the number of artworks that are about or influenced by Daoism and Buddhism.

== Elements and themes ==
When Confucius was elevated to the rank of Supreme Sage and the Uncrown King (Su Wang), Confucian art became identified with the art of Confucius in recognition to the sage's central position in the transmission of the Chinese ancient culture. Notable elements of this art are calligraphy of Confucian writings and thoughts, often contained within Confucian temples and schools, as well as whiteware ceramics and pottery related to Confucian religious and scholarly practices. In China, Chinese scholar's rocks were part of this tradition. As most importantly the Korean stone art which continues to this day. Themes and subjects usually include the depiction of prominent Confucian figures such as statesmen, poets, and painters, among others. These are the subjects, for instance, of the paintings of Zhang Lu (1464-1538). Artworks also reflected prevailing interests during the Confucian period such as chess, music, and painting in addition to the depiction of the didactic pictorial narratives of the life of Confucius and the twenty-four paragons of filial piety.

Confucian art is demonstrated in the Six Classics: The Book of Odes, which describes the will; the Book of Documents, which describes events; The Book of Ritual, which focuses on conduct; The Book of Music, which is about harmony; the Book of Changes for the concept of the yin and yang; and, The Spring and Autumn Annals, which describes titles and functions.

Confucian art may also be distinguished between classical early period, neo-Confucianism, and post-modern Confucian art.

== Ancient Cultivation Stories: Confucius and Ran Qiu ==
Every one of Confucius' students had his own character. Some were modest and keen to learn; some were strong and argumentative; some were cowardly and slow to improve. However, Confucius would teach each student according to his nature guiding him along the way so that he/she may become a useful and talented person.

Ran Qiu was a very talented person. He really hoped to improve his political abilities and obtain the opportunity to be promoted to become a government official after learning from Confucius.

Officials in ancient times had to understand poetry, literature, ritual, and music, only when they had a good understanding of this knowledge could they work for the people. In order to improve on these abilities to become a government official, Ran Qiu followed Confucius as his teacher and diligently studied a variety of subjects and skills.

After some time, however, Confucius found that Ran Qiu had become idle and lazy and was no longer curious to understand and discuss the principles taught in the class. Therefore, one day after the class, Confucius asked Ran Qiu the reason for this.

Ran Qiu said, "It is not that I don't like the principles that you teach. It is just because I am lacking in ability!"

In fact, Ran Qiu thought that the principles that Confucius taught were too high and were different from what he had expected them to be. Ran Qiu had only planned to learn from Confucius the abilities necessary to become a government official. Then, with the help of Confucius' reputation, he would get the chance to start his political career. But when he came to Confucius's school, he found that the principles Confucius taught seemed to be apart from society. Though the ideals were high, it was not easy to follow them in practice.

Holding such thoughts, Ran Qiu started to become lazy and felt it was useless no matter how much more he learned. In addition, Ran Qiu also attributed his poor performance in the class to his own insufficient abilities. He thought that, since he was not capable enough, he would never be able to achieve the level that Confucius was teaching, so why did he need to study carefully?

Confucius however didn't think that Ran Qiu's declining performance was due to a lack of ability. Therefore, he told Ran Qiu, "Look at those people who don't have enough ability. They usually stop and give up halfway, whereas you draw a boundary in front of yourself to restrict you from moving forward. How can you make progress that way?"

After hearing what Confucius had to say, Ran Qiu was ashamed and lowered his head. Confucius continued, "Before you fully demonstrate your ability, you should not easily give up the effort to strive forward; you shouldn't feel so desperate about yourself so easily. As long as you try your best to do everything well, you will find that you have good potential!"

After Confucius had encouraged him, Ran Qiu was again full of confidence and resumed his usual earnest learning attitude. It was after this that Ran Qiu took note of Confucius' skills as a teacher!
