= Suiseki =

Japanese term for shaped rocks (natural or artistic)

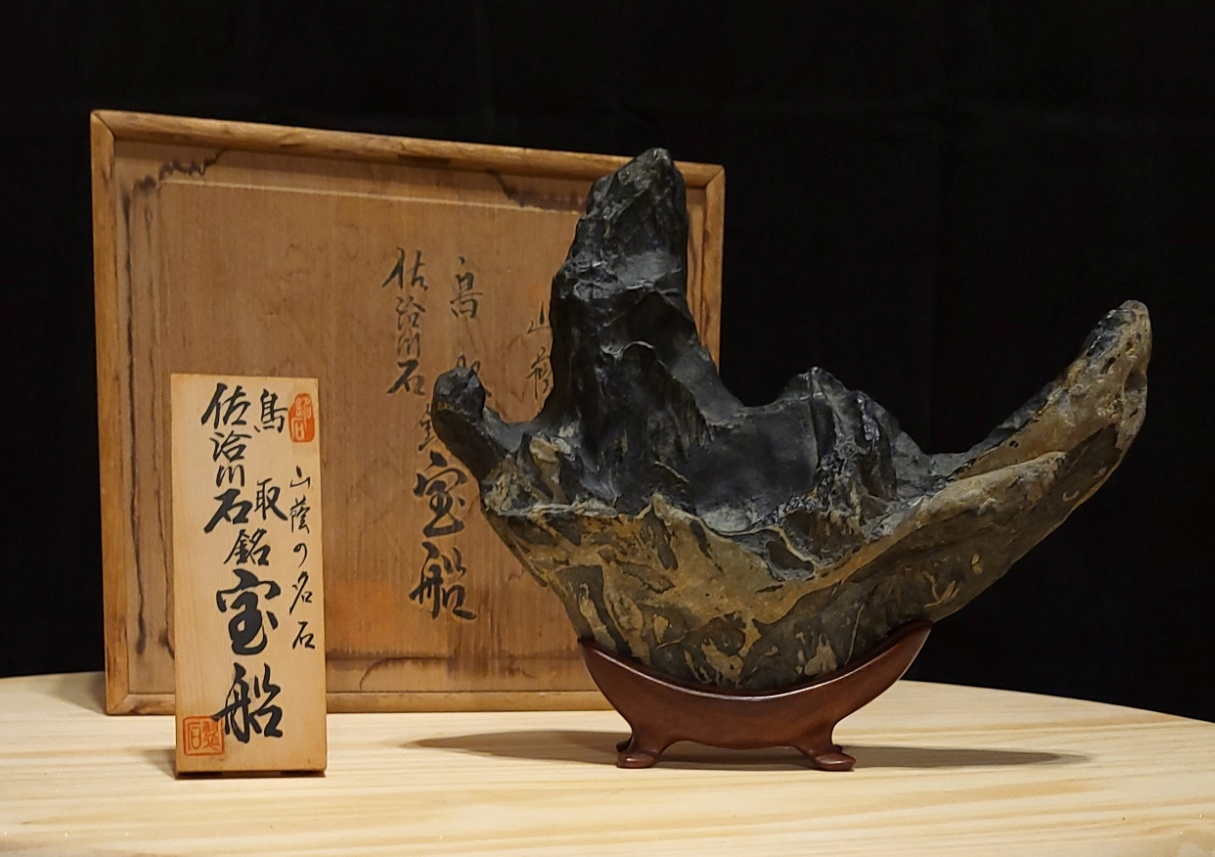
The “Takarabune” (宝船, treasure ship) stone.This Japanese suiseki with base (daiza) and box, is an incredibly rare and symbolic stone. The wooden plaque and box inscription explain that this famous stone comes from the Saji River (佐治川, Saji-gawa) in the San'in region of Japan, in Tottori Prefecture.

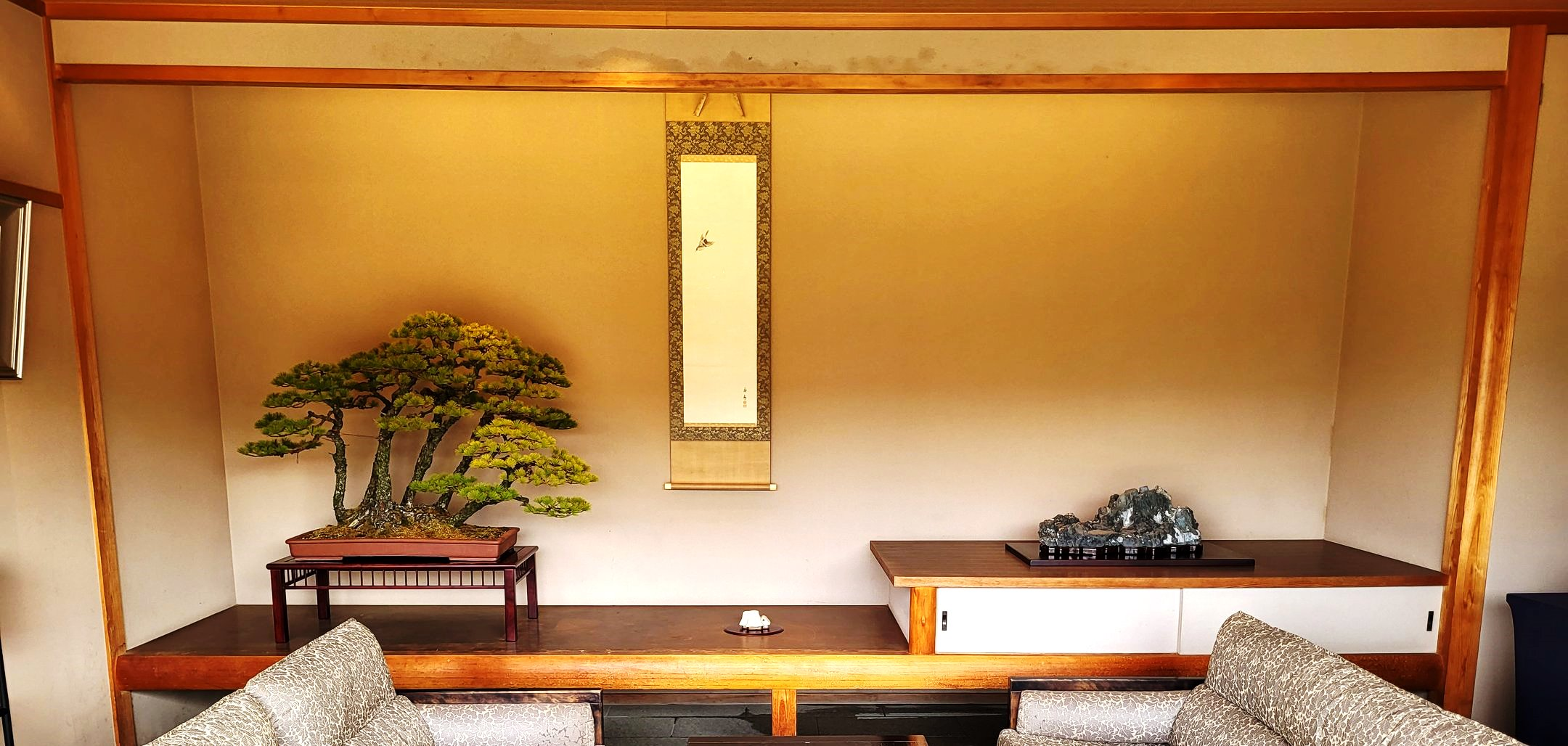
A tokonoma display of bonsai and suiseki; the display incorporates a hanging scroll. This tokonoma is located at Hanyu Uchiku-tei garden in Saitama, Japan.

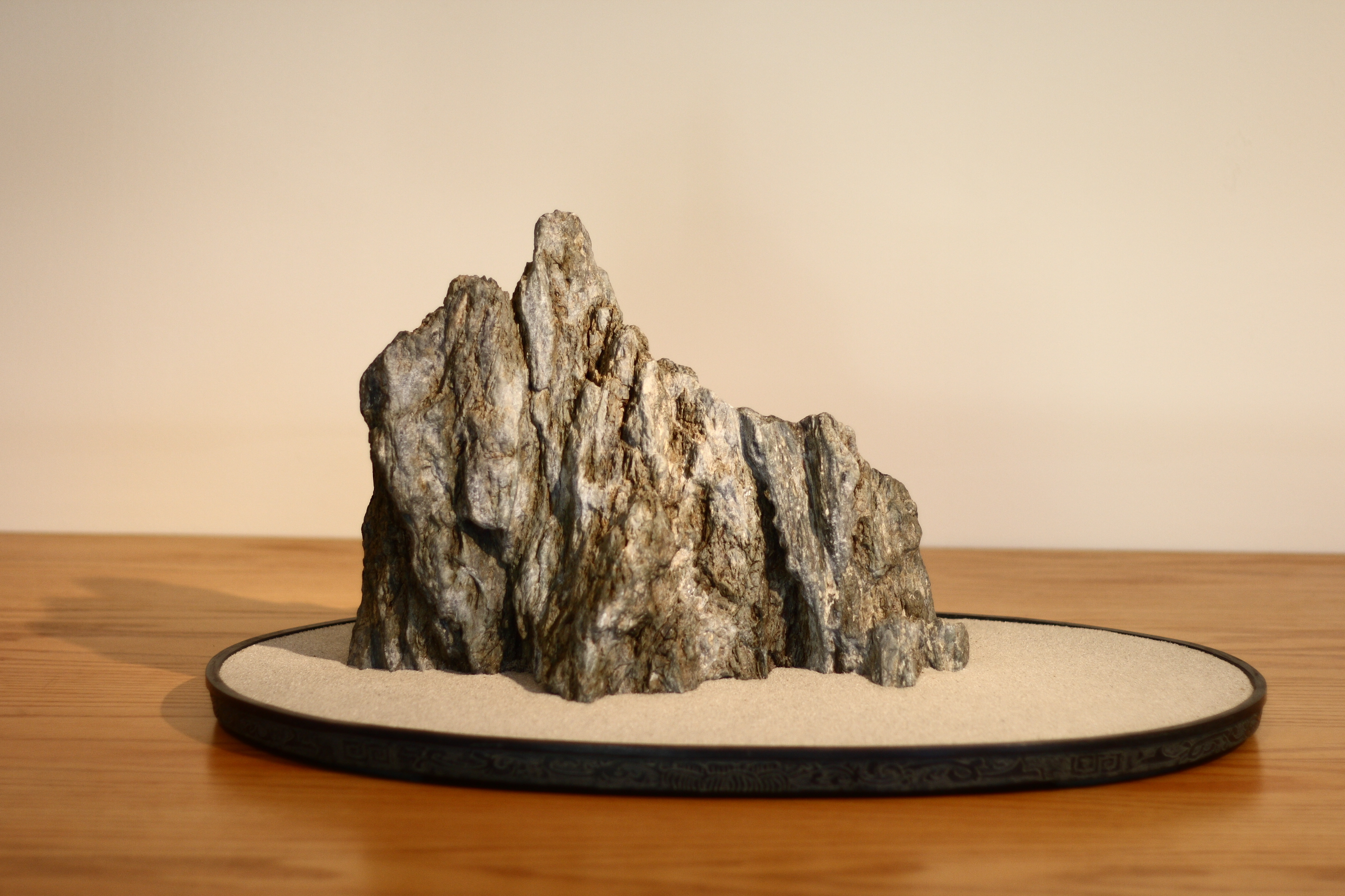
Suiseki stone in its bronze doban tray filled with sand

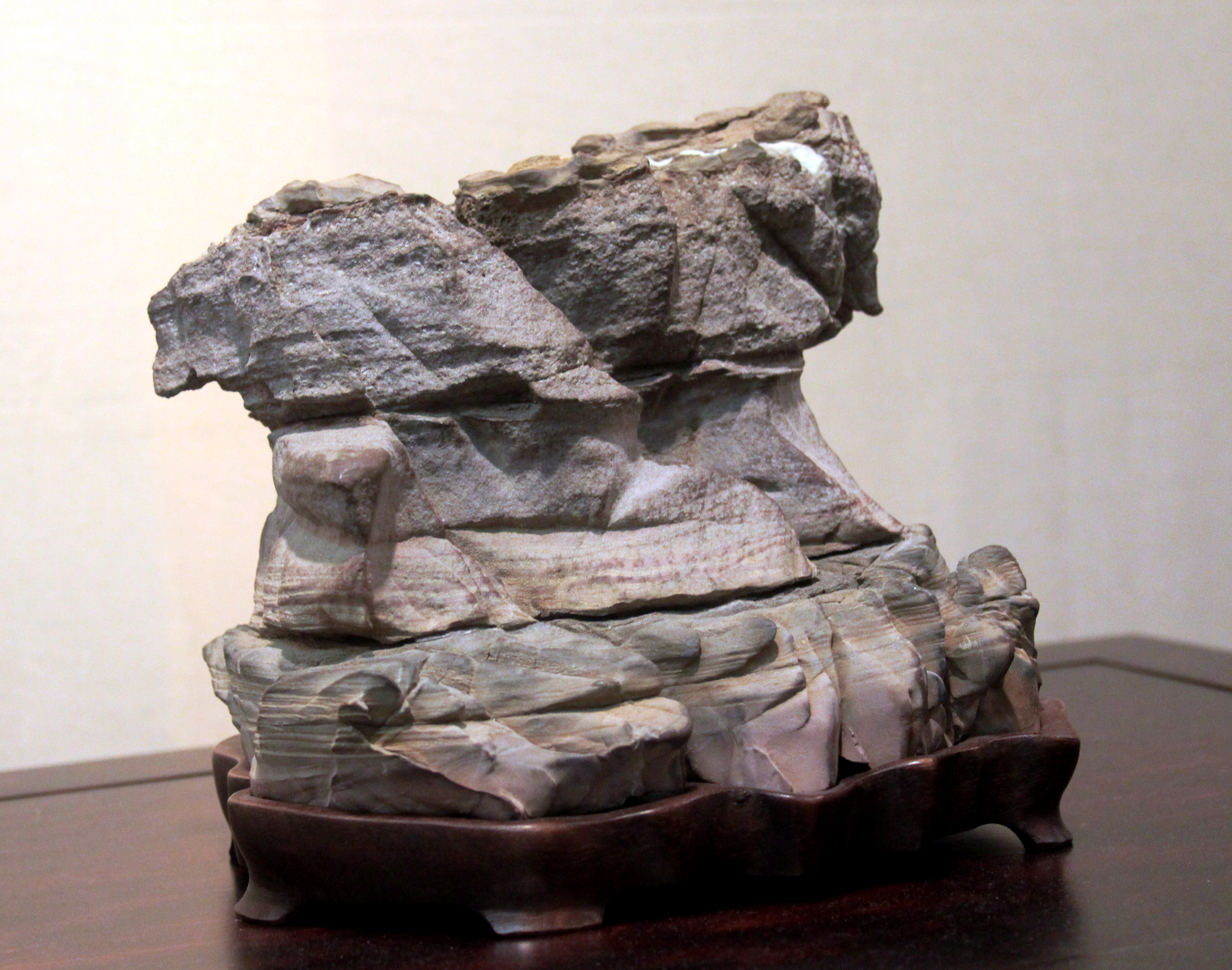
Suiseki and its wooden daiza base

In traditional Japanese culture, suiseki (水石) ("水" means Water and "石" is Stone, suiseki means water stone in Japanese) are small, naturally occurring stones which are appreciated for their beauty and power to evoke a natural scene or object. Suiseki is said to have originated from the fourteenth-century Chinese interest in stone appreciation; a suiseki stone is said to have been displayed by Japanese Emperor Go-Daigo (1288–1339).

Suiseki is tightly intertwined with the Japanese art of bonsai, and it is said that they are the twin pillars of the traditional appreciation of the vastness and essence of nature in Japanese culture. Suiseki and bonsai are frequently displayed together in a tokonoma.

== History ==
Chinese scholar's rocks called gongshi influenced the development of suiseki in Japan. The history of suiseki in Japan begins during the reign of Empress Suiko. The small objects were brought to Japan as gifts from the Chinese Imperial court.

Suiseki are usually presented in two different ways:

- The stone is provided with a wooden base (daiza).
- The stone is placed in a waterproof tray or bowl of ceramic (水盤 suiban) or bronze (doban).

These stones are not just any stones which can be found in nature; they must be expressive stones and have a special shape, color and texture to be categorized as suiseki. There is a distinction between landscape and object stones. The former reflect landscapes such as mountains, lakes or rivers, while other stones have object shapes that resemble animals or sculptures.

The stones are of natural origin and are found in rivers, oceans and karst areas. They are not allowed to be reshaped. An exception is the cutting of stones to have a flat base, so they can be placed stably on a daiza, suiban or doban, to be displayed properly. However, this diminishes their value in the eyes of some enthusiasts.

== Evaluation ==
The evaluation of suiseki recognizes subtlety of color, shape, markings and surface. According to Hideo Marushima (丸島秀夫, Marushima Hideo; 1934- ) in The History of Suiseki in Japan (日本愛石史, Nihon aisekishi),

It is not a silly thing at all to enjoy a stone in a tray. I see the whole world in a tiny stone. Some objects in this world are huge, and others are small, and they come in all shapes, but they are not that different when you look at their essence.

Popular types of suiseki suggest a mountain, a waterfall, an island, a thatched hut or an animal.

In Japan, suiseki stones are primarily classified from where they were collected, and mainly from rivers. The three major stones in suiseki are Sajigawa-ishi (suiseki from the river Sajigawa), Kamogawa-ishi (from the river Kamogawa) and Setagawa-ishi (from the river Setagawa). Shape, color and texture are also characteristics used in the classification of suiseki.

Images of the catalog for the 2014 Japan Suiseki Exhibition held at the Tokyo Metropolitan Art Museum.

== Exhibitions ==
The most important and prestigious suiseki exhibition in Japan (and by extension, the world) is the Exhibition of Japanese Suiseki Masterpieces, commonly known as the Meihin-ten (銘品展). This exhibition is held at the Tokyo Metropolitan Art Museum, alongside the popular Kokufu-ten bonsai exhibition, in the month of February. A catalog of the suiseki presented at the exhibition is produced each year.

In the United States, suiseki are presented alongside bonsai at the biennial U.S. National Bonsai Exhibition in Rochester, New York. Exhibitions are also organized by the European Suiseki Association (ESA), among others.

The National Bonsai & Penjing Museum in Washington, DC, part of the U.S. National Arboretum, has an important collection of suiseki and viewing stones in display. The collection includes Japanese suiseki and Chinese scholars’ rocks.

== See also ==
- Chinese scholar's rocks
- Suseok in Korea
- Bonseki
