= Suseok =

Korean term for rocks (natural or artistic) which resemble landscapes

- Hangul: 수석
- Hanja: 水石, 壽石
- RR: suseok
- MR: susŏk
- IPA: [sʰu.sʰʌk̚]

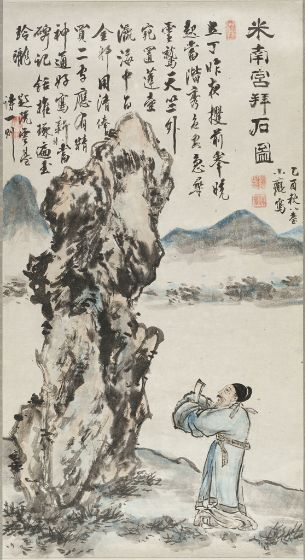
Korean artwork shows scholar paying homage to a special stone – painting with calligraphy by Hŏ Ryŏn, 1885

Suseok (Korean: 수석), also called viewing stones or scholar's stones, is the Korean term for rocks resembling natural landscapes. The term also refers to the art of stone appreciation. The stone may be hand-carved or naturally occurring, with natural stones being of greater value. Such stones are similar to Chinese gongshi (供石) and Japanese suiseki (水石).

Suseok can be any color. They vary widely in size – suseok can weigh hundreds of kilograms or much less than one kilogram, the largest of which may be displayed in traditional Korean gardens.

== History ==
Chinese gongshi influenced the development of suseok in Korea.

Suseok became a fixture of Korean society during the Joseon Dynasty, when Confucian scholars displayed them on their writing desks. From here is where the English name "scholar's rock" originates. Suseok regained popularity amongst nouveau riche businessmen in the 1980s during Korea's economic boom.

The art usually works on three scales: large installations of monumental shaped stones as ornamental gates; medium-sized shaped stones for landscape decoration within Korean gardens; and the smaller shaped stones for scholar's tables, the most important of these scales.

== Evaluation ==
Early on, important sites within landscape were marked with shaped stones, similarly to distance markers on post roads. Burial sites were also given permanent marking by large scale tumuli or mounds, often surrounded by anthropomorphic shaped stones much akin to that of Inuit or First Nations' memory markers. The animistic belief of nature being alive, and large-scaled elements of nature having souls, has led to the continued use of massive sculpted stone in natural forms throughout Korean traditional entranceways, as the firstgrowth cedarwood traditionally used for gates is now rare.

As Confucian scholarship ascended into the golden age of the Joseon dynasty, scholar rocks became an essential fixture of the writing tables of the yangban class of scholars, and a brilliant example of Confucian art. Smaller ceramic versions of scholar's rocks have been seen cast in celadon and used as brush-holders, as well as water droppers for scholar's calligraphy – particularly in the shape of small mountains.

== Genres of Korean stone art ==
- mountain view (horizontal and vertical)
- shaped jade mountains
- shaped rock crystal mountains
- abstract shape
- overhanging shapes
- organic mineral shapes (calcites, pyrites)
- stalactite and stalagmite stelae
- shamanistic shape
- single stone buddhas
- multiple stone buddhas
- astrological year figures (dragon, snake, monkey etc.)
- tree and house shapes
- fossilized fish
- fossilized insects
- enhanced coloured stones

== In popular culture ==
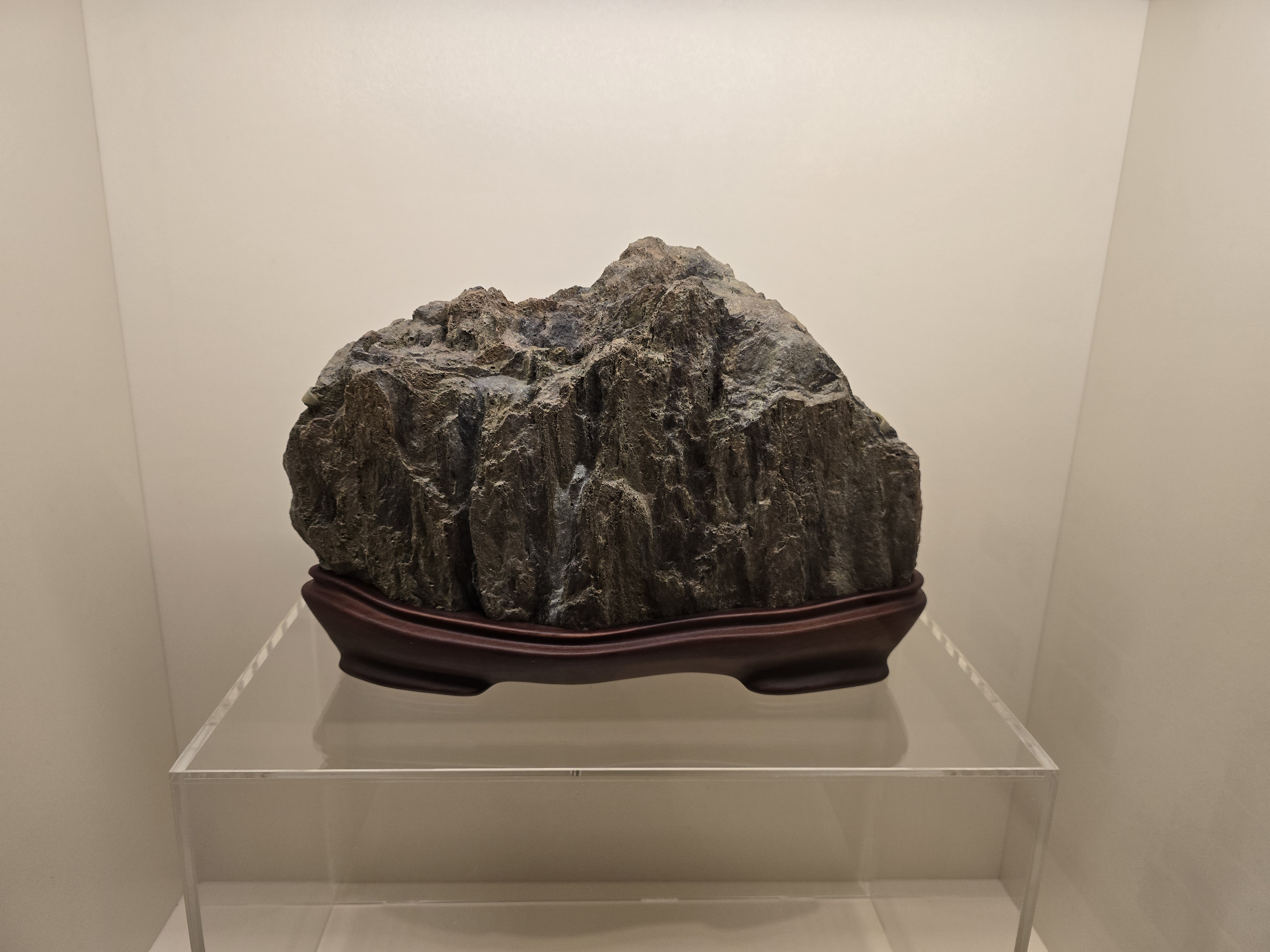
The prop suseok used in the movie Parasite, displayed at the Academy Museum of Motion Pictures

A large desk-sized suseok appears prominently in the 2019 Korean film Parasite where it is given as a gift from one of the characters in the film to another. The suseok first appears to bring great fortune to the main character's immediate family, but the family then loses all of this fortune and is destroyed by their own greed. In one scene it is used as a weapon to attack one of the main characters. At the end of the film, it is placed in a river to be forgotten.

== Standard reference work ==
- Soosuk, #72 in a series of books on Korean culture, Daewonsa Publishing Co, Ltd (Korea, 1989), ISBN 89-369-0072-2 (in Korean)

== See also ==
- Gongshi
- Suiseki
- Korean art
- Korean sculpture
- Korean culture
