= Gongshi =

Chinese shaped rocks (natural or artistic)

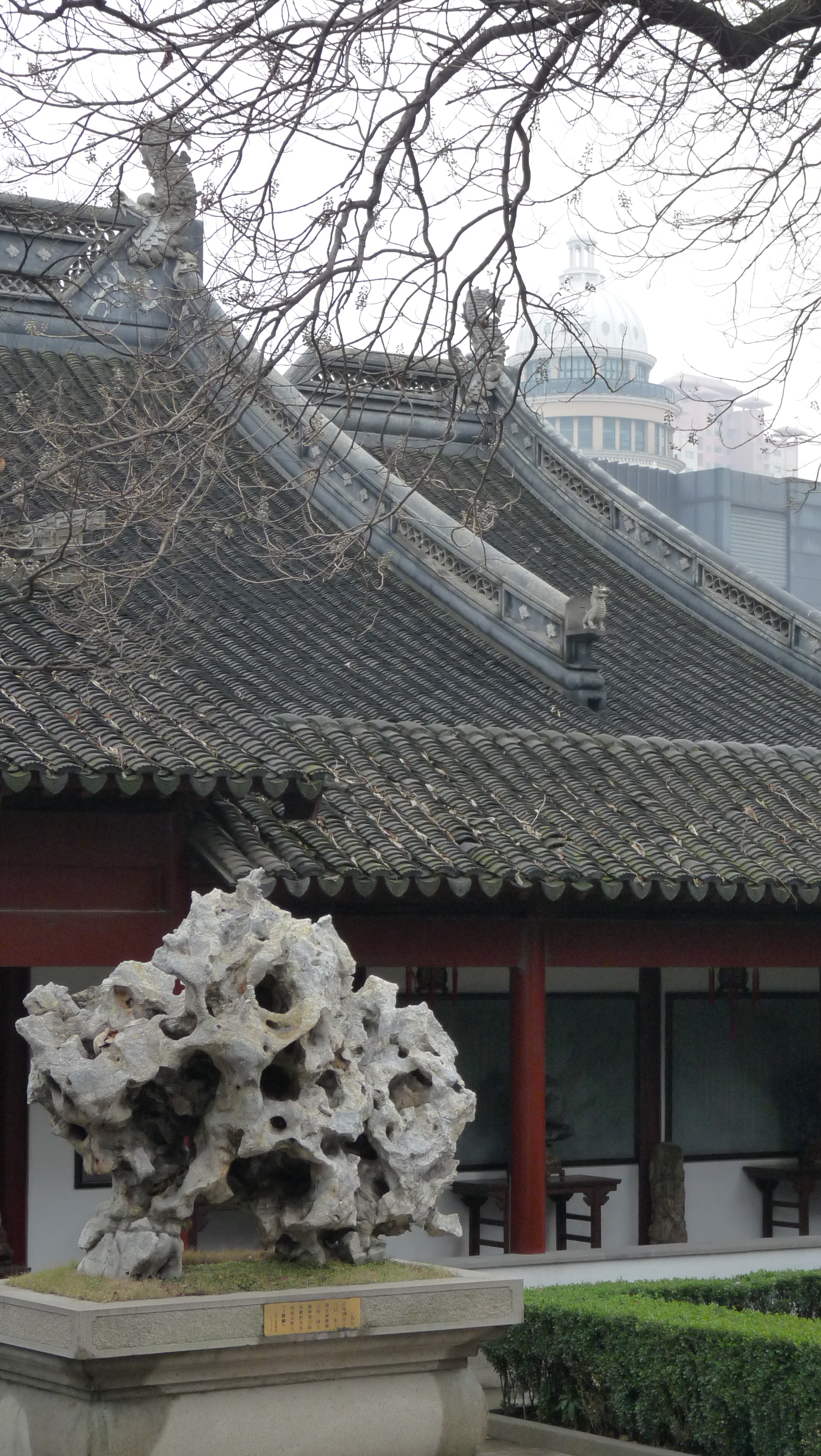
Gongshi (Scholar's rock) in Wenmiao temple, Shanghai

Gongshi (Chinese: 供石), also known as scholar's rocks or viewing stones, are naturally occurring or shaped rocks which are traditionally appreciated by Chinese scholars. The term is related to the Korean suseok (수석) and the Japanese suiseki (水石).

Scholars' rocks can be any color, and contrasting colors are not uncommon. The size of the stone can also be quite varied: scholars' rocks can weigh hundreds of pounds or less than one pound. The term also identifies stones which are placed in traditional Chinese gardens.

== History ==
In the Tang dynasty, a set of four important qualities for the rocks were recognized. They are: thinness (瘦 shòu), openness (透 tòu), perforations (漏 lòu), and wrinkling (皱 zhòu).

Gongshi influenced the development of Korean suseok and Japanese suiseki.

== Sources ==
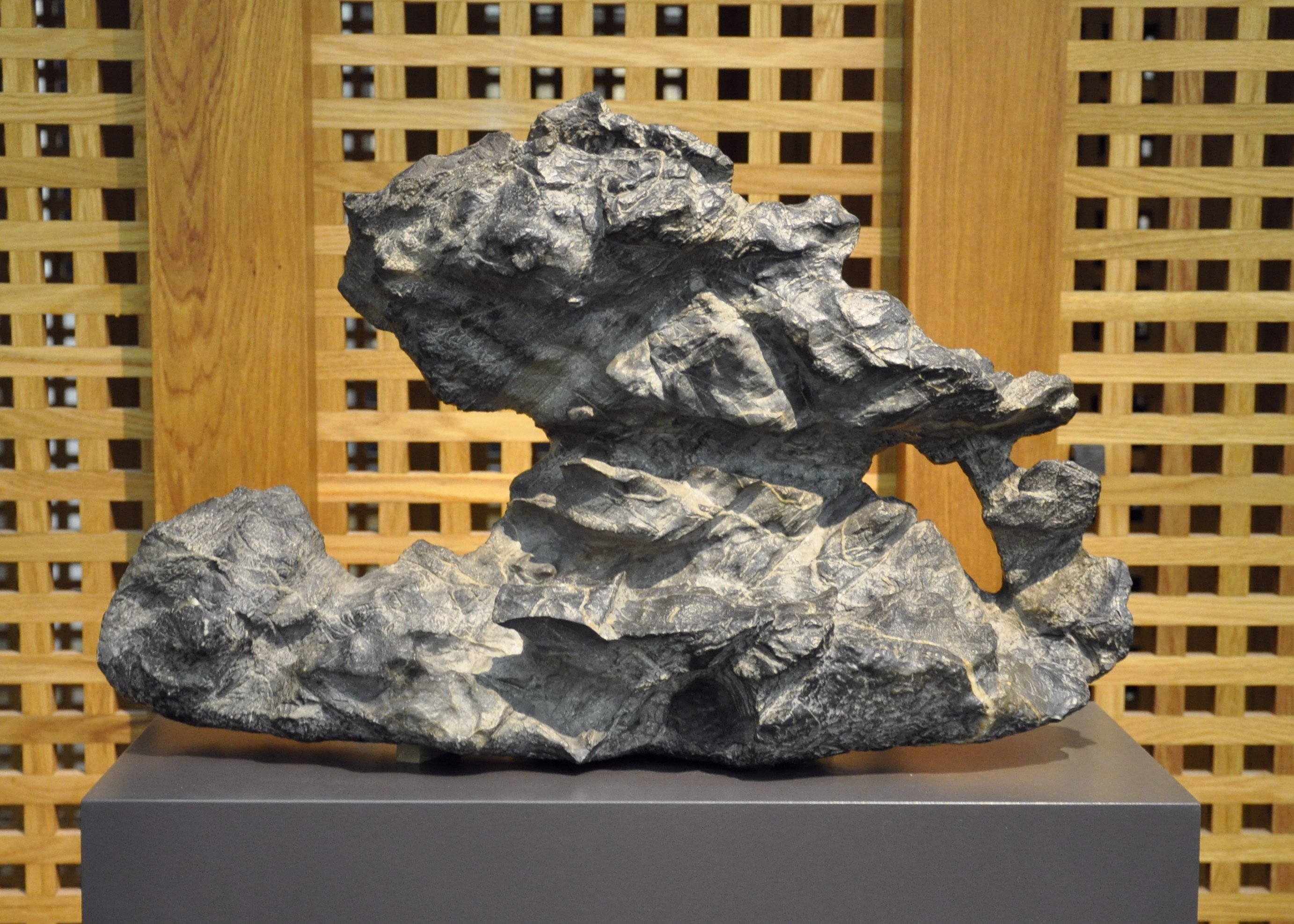
Lingbi stone from Anhui. Ming Dynasty, 15th century

There are three main Chinese sources for these stones.

- Lingbi stone (Lingbishi) (灵璧石) from Lingbi, Anhui province, limestone
- Taihu stone (Taihushi) (太湖石) from Lake Tai, Jiangsu province, limestone
- Yingde stone (Yingshi or Yingdeshi) (英石 or 英德石) from Yingde, Guangdong province, limestone

The geological conditions needed for the formation of stones are also present at some other sites.

== Formation ==
Scholar's stones are generally karstic limestone. Limestone is water-soluble under some conditions. Dissolution pitting dissolves hollows in the limestone. On a larger scale, this causes speleogenesis (when caves dissolve in limestone bedrock). On a still larger scale, the dissolved caves collapse, gradually creating karst topography, such as the famous landscapes of Guilin in the South China Karst.

As rocks are broadly fractal (geology journals require a scale to be included in images of rocks), the small rocks can resemble the larger landscape.

== Aesthetics ==
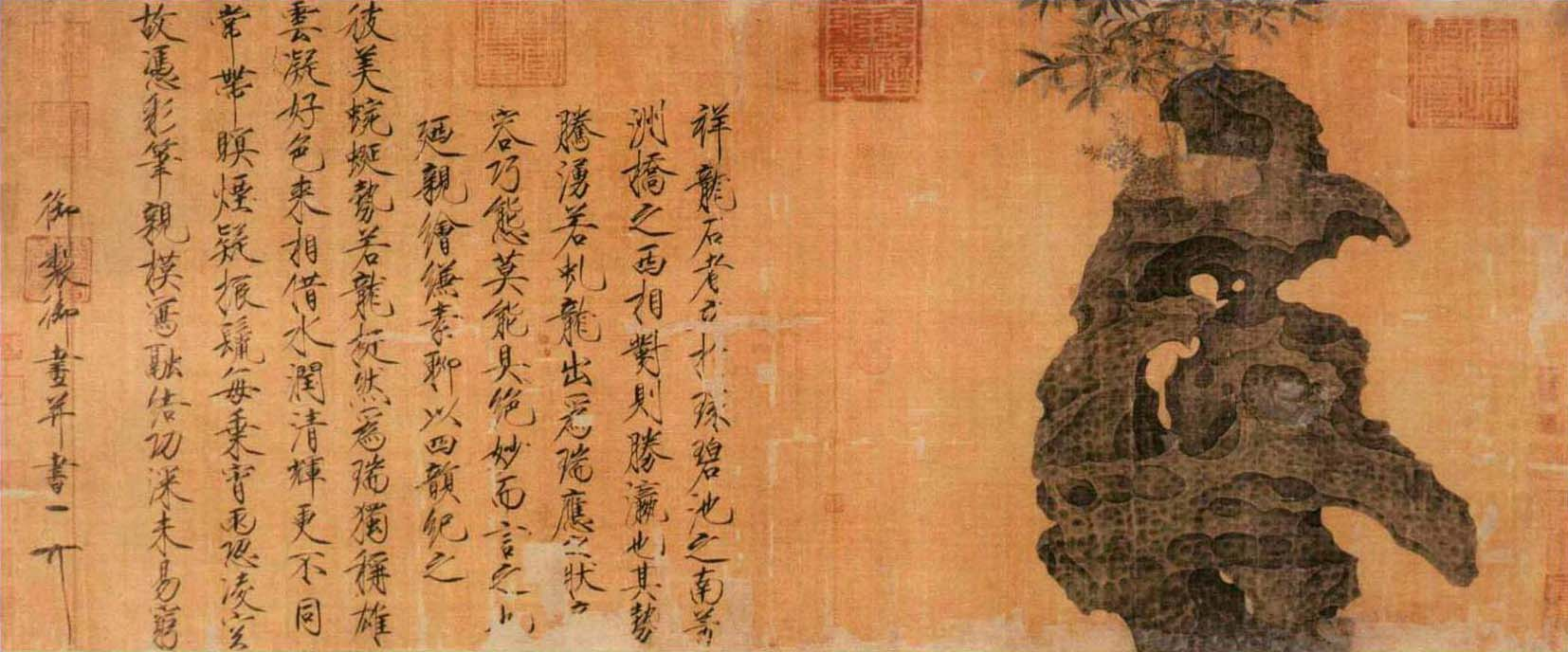
Emperor Huizong of Song painted Auspicious Dragon Rock (祥龍石圖), depicting a water-eroded Taihu rock that was likened to a dragon

The aesthetics of a scholar's rock is based on subtleties of color, shape, markings, surface, and sound. Prized qualities include:

- awkward or overhanging asymmetry
- resonance or ringing when struck
- representation or resemblance to mountainous landscapes, particularly these believed to be inhabited by immortal beings or figures
- texture
- moistness or glossy surface

The stone may be displayed on a rosewood pedestal that has been carved specifically for the stone. The stones are a traditional subject of Chinese paintings.

== Gallery ==
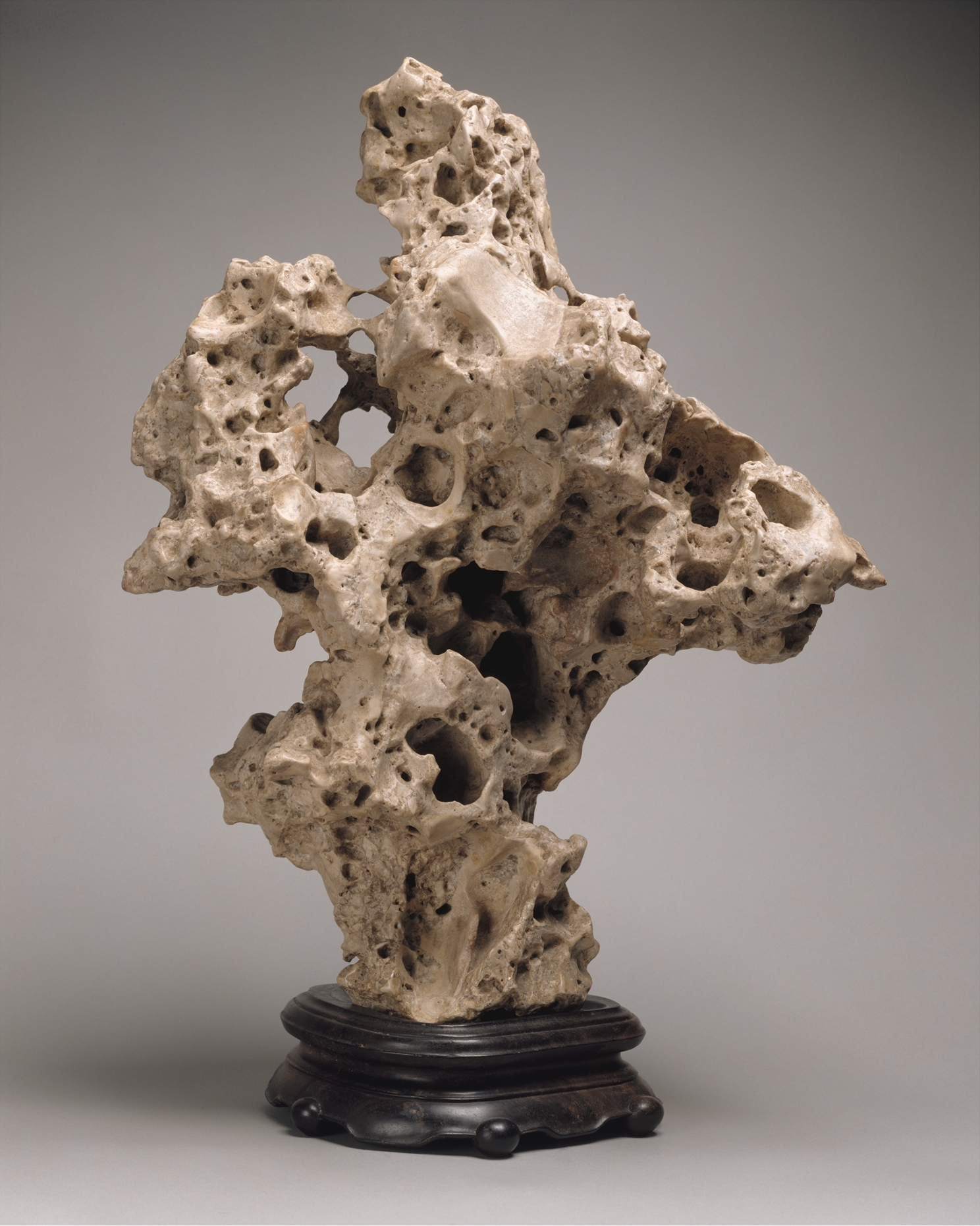
Taihu limestone

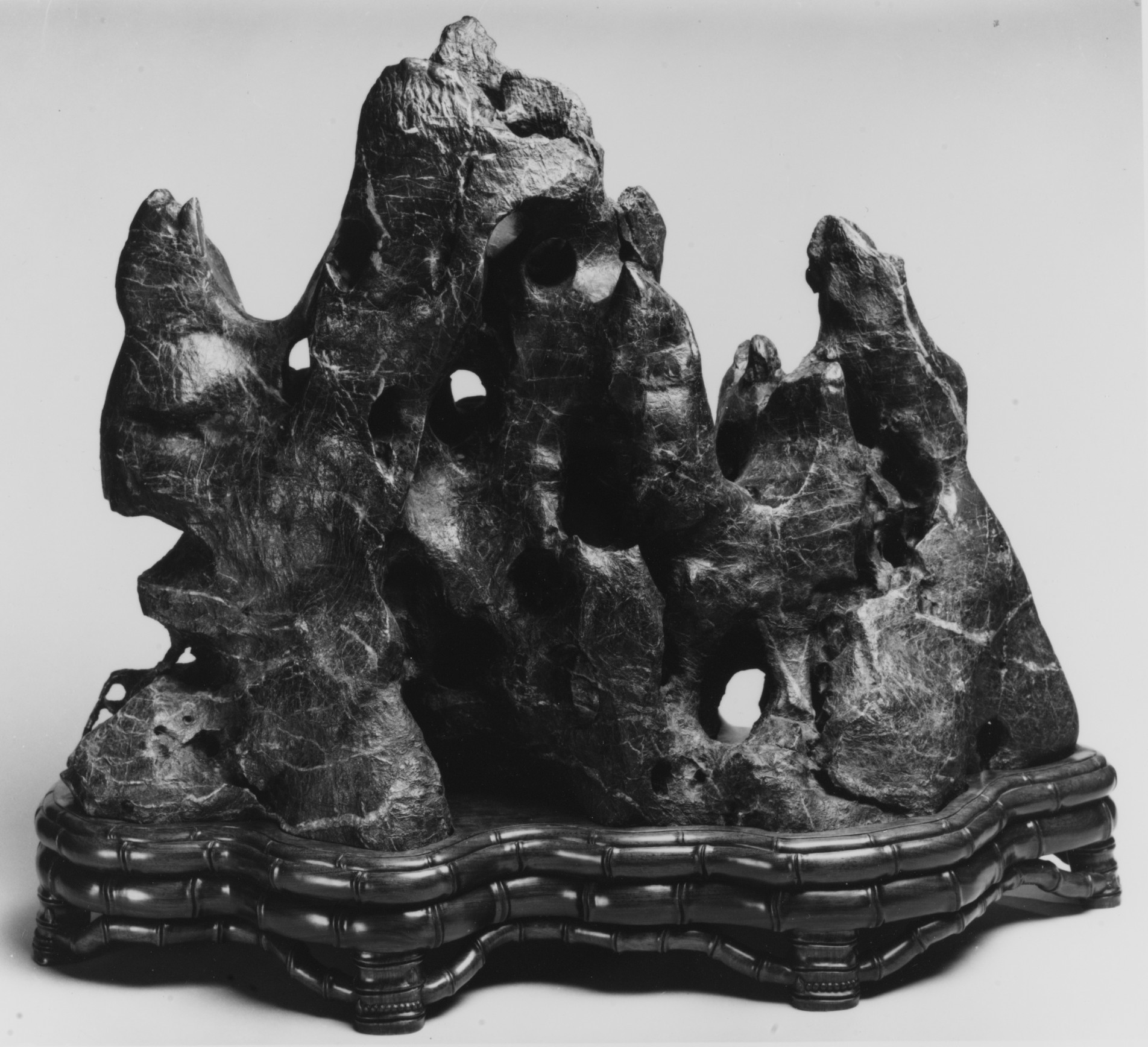
Black Lingbi limestone

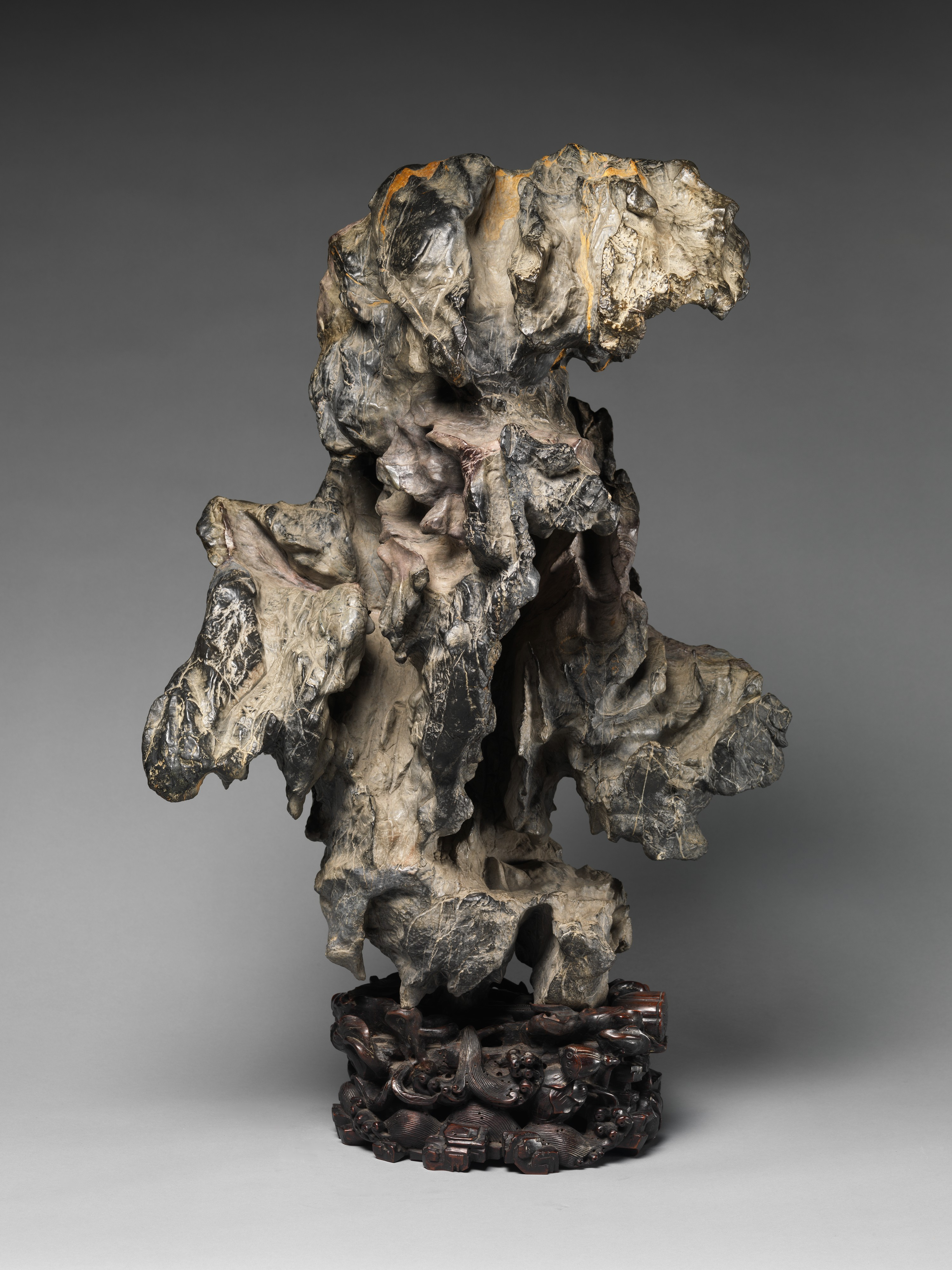
Gray Lingbi limestone

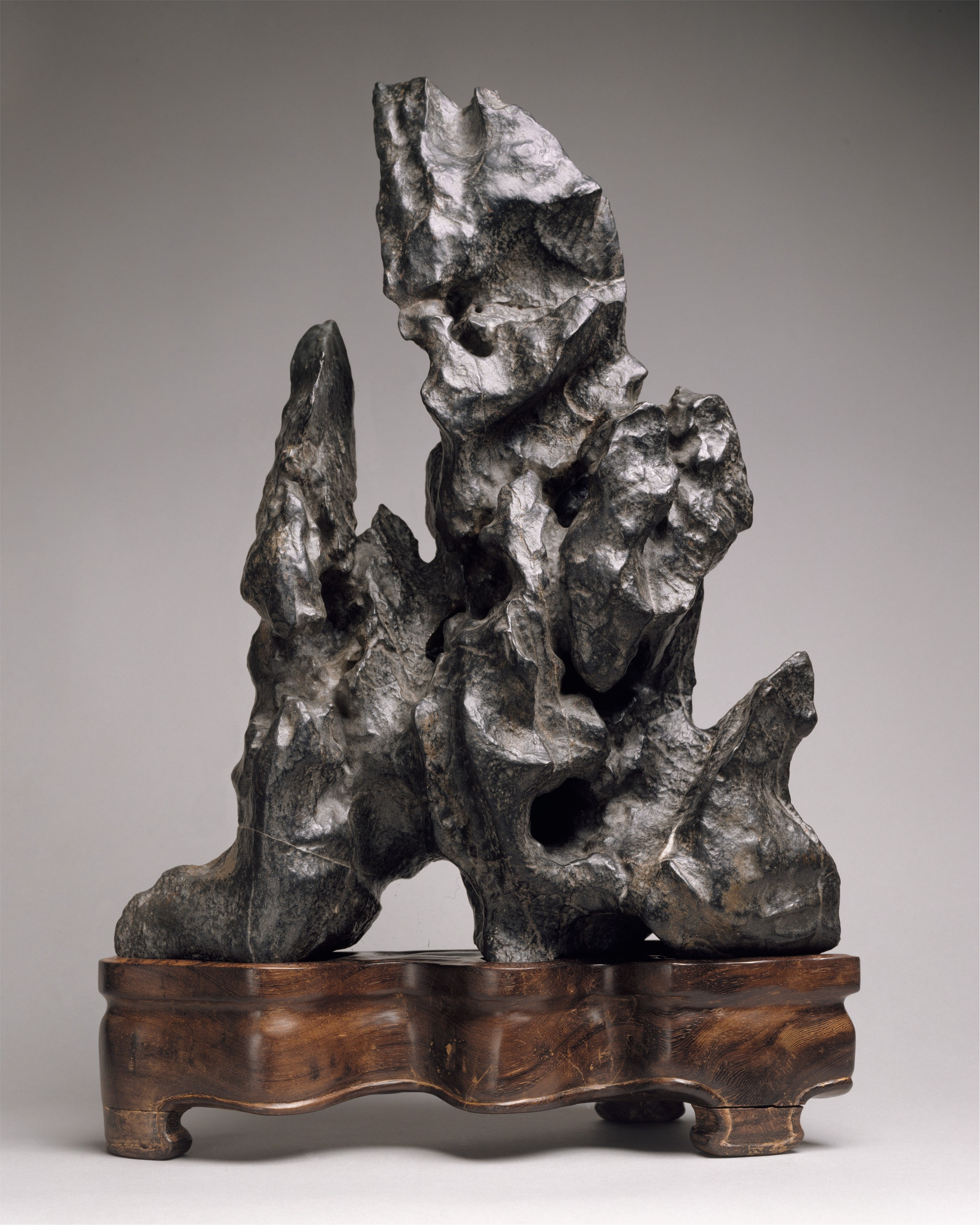
Black Lingbi limestone

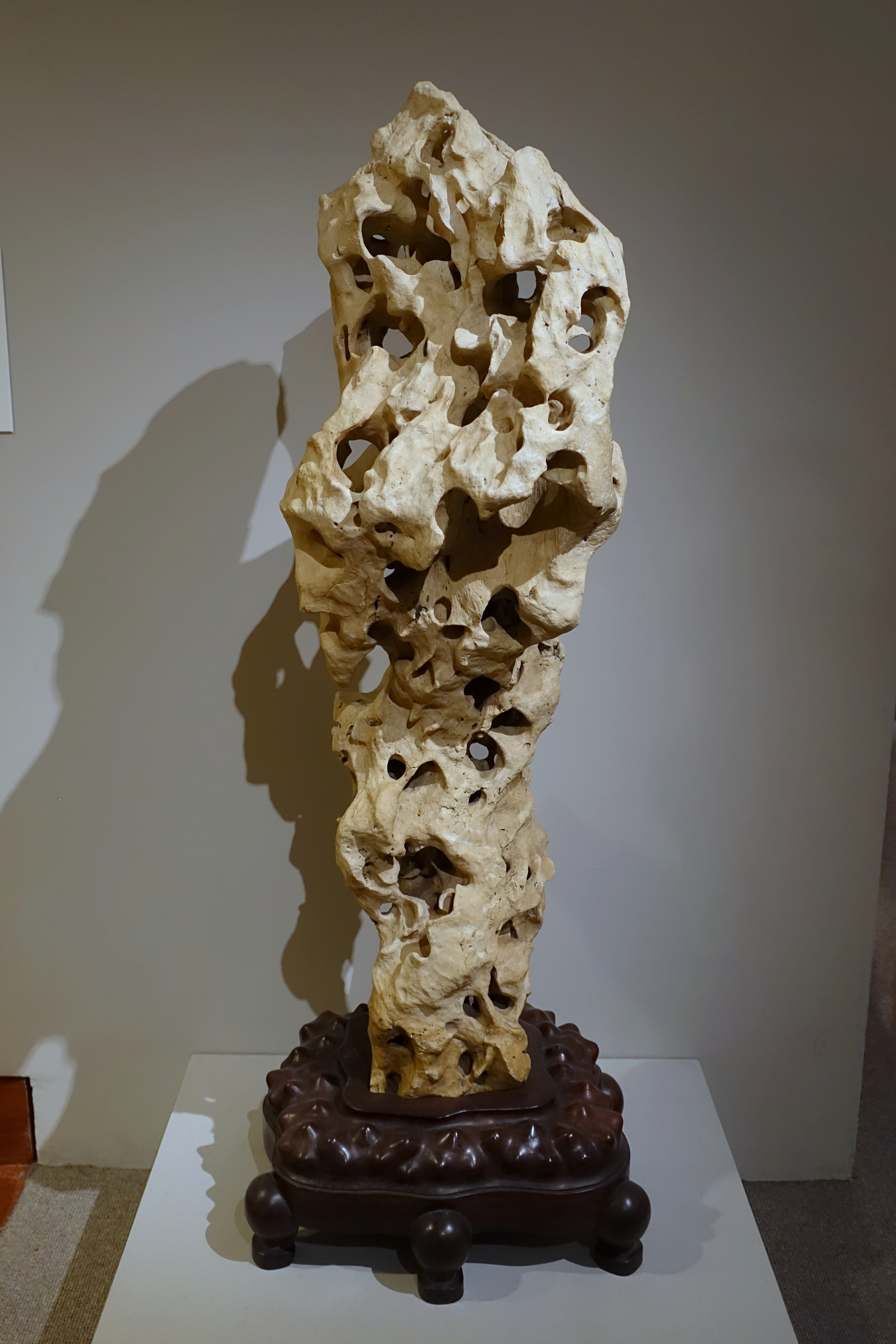
Taihu limestone

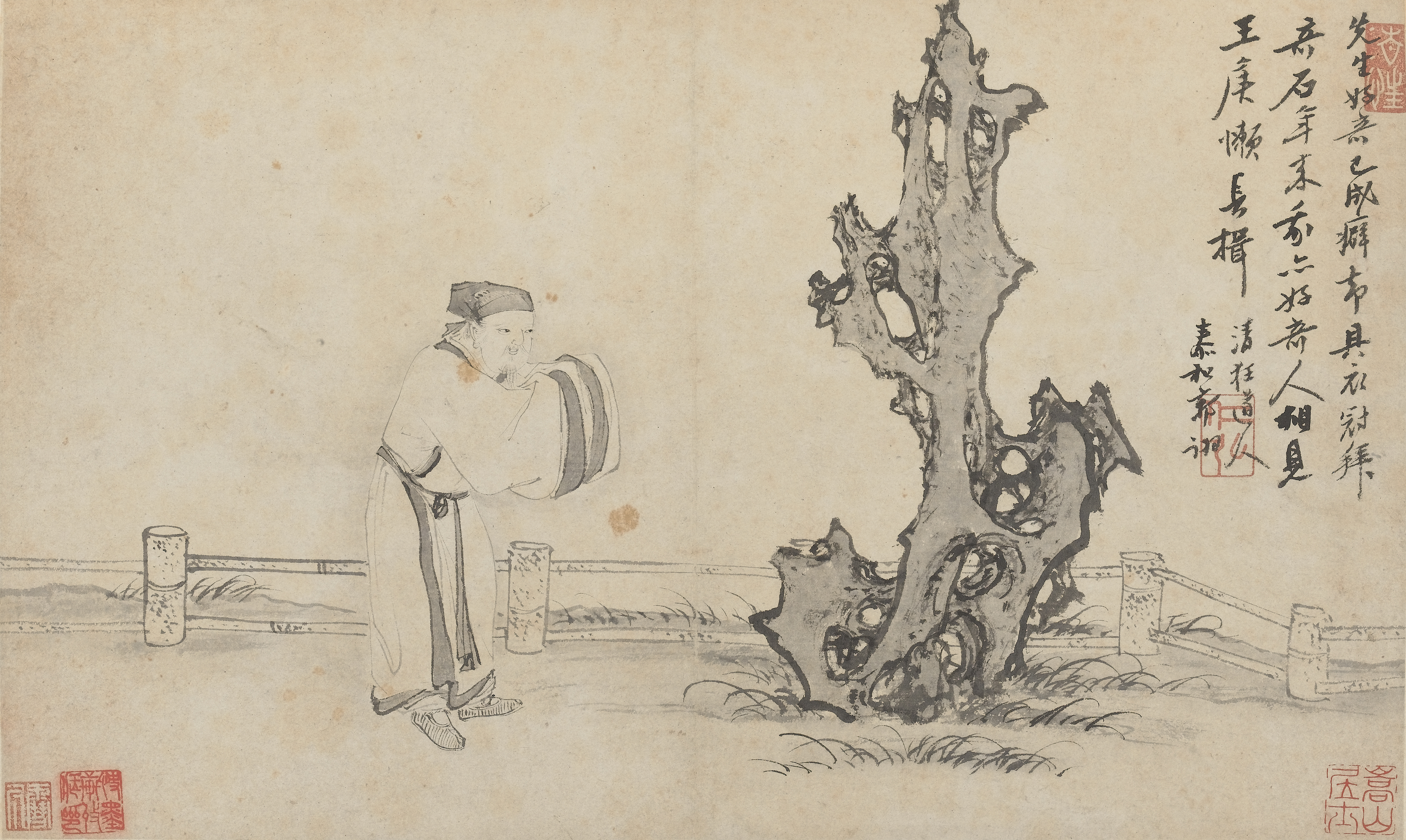
In 1503, Guo Xu painted Mi Fu Bowing to a Rock. The 11th-century calligrapher Mi Fu, often regarded as eccentric, believed that some of these rocks had their own souls and would pay them his respects by bowing.

== See also ==
- Geode – Hollow formation inside a rock
- Penjing – Chinese miniature trees and landscapes
- Wabisabi – Japanese aesthetic about imperfection
- Suseok – Korean equivalent to gongshi
- Suiseki – Japanese equivalent to gongshi
