= Bonsai display table =

Piece of furniture

A bonsai display table is a piece of furniture used as an aesthetic style element for the targeted appreciation of a bonsai.

== Overview ==
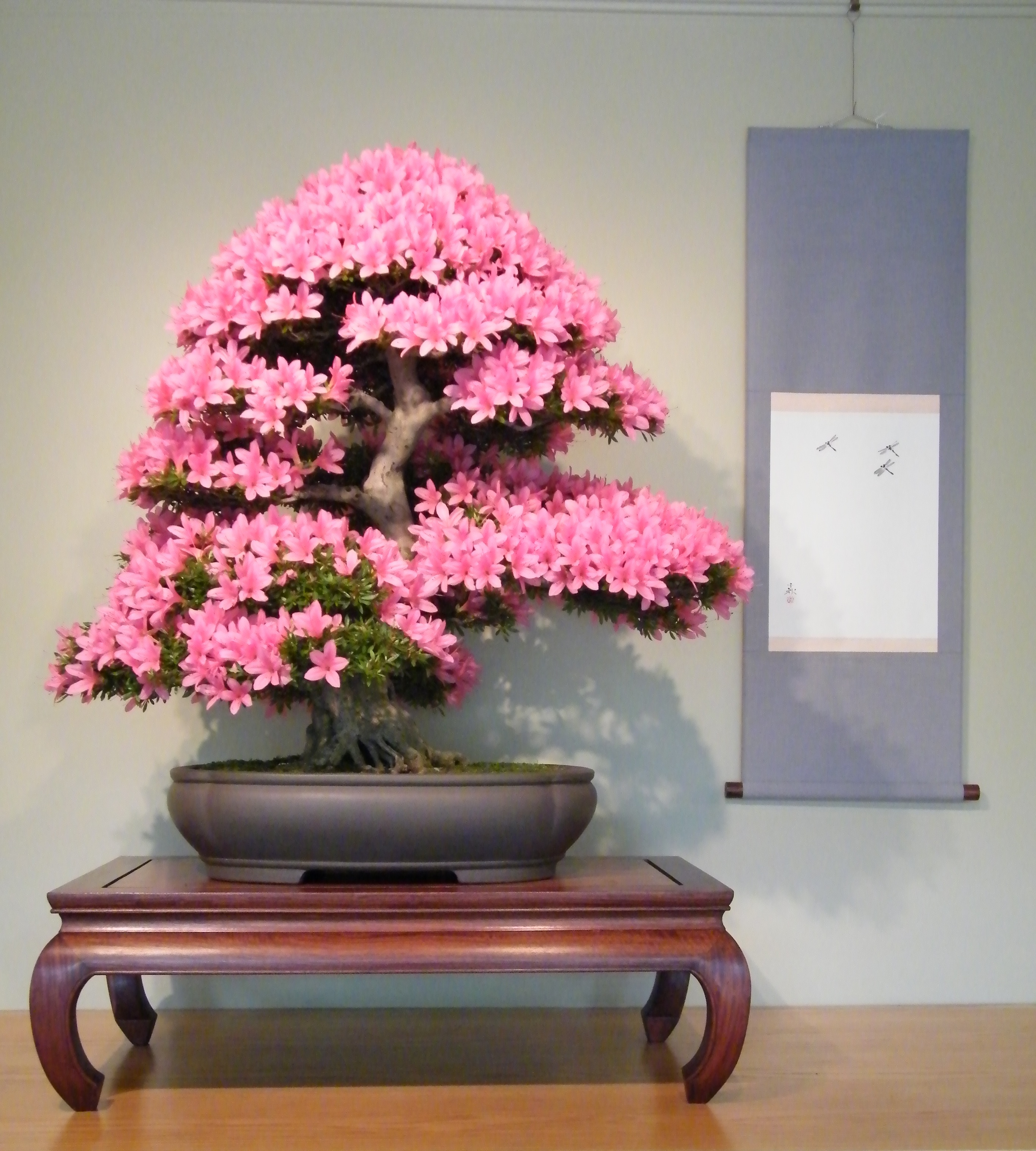
Satsuki Azalea in informal upright style on a bonsai display table with a rectangular tabletop

Bonsai display tables as a stylistic element of the overall conception of the tree, pot and table have a mainly aesthetic function. The task of the bonsai display table is to present the bonsai higher than the given surface, which gives the bonsai an additional charm, grace and formality as well as a stronger character, but also to improve the angle of view on the tree.

Traditional asian bonsai display tables are mostly made from dark woods such as rosewood or walnut, which are almost exclusively painted with a dark satin-finish glaze.

== Selection ==
The size and appearance of the bonsai display table should be selected in such a way, that it complements both the tree and its pot, without attracting much attention. In addition to the table size, the execution of the table legs - if appropriate - must be considered. These should be able to bear the weight of the bonsai convincingly and preferably not compete with the thickness of the trunk. Bonsai pots should not protrude at any side of the table and should not compete with the table in their layout. In general, the table should be about 1/3 larger than the bonsai pot. Flat bonsai display tables with rectangular tabletops are usually selected. Bonsai in cascade-style and semi-cascade-style are generally presented on higher tables with a square or round tabletop. Shohin bonsai are often shown in small groups on specially produced presentation shelves - a special form of the display table.

In order to integrate the impression of a landscape image around the bonsai into the presentation, especially for bonsai in the design forms of literati or Saikei, unevenly shaped rock slabs or wooden discs are used.

== Use ==
Bonsai display tables are used in Japan in particular, and are usually found in the traditional Tokonoma, a niche dedicated to art. From this tradition, there are also some basic rules for the placement of bonsai on the table to be derived from, which are observed worldwide especially at exhibitions. At exhibitions, the presentation of a bonsai with its pot on a formal table has also become the standard. In the western world, however, there are also proponents of the fact that a table for bonsai presentation is a minimum standard in the home and garden, even outside of exhibitions.

A disadvantage for the everyday use outside of exhibitions is the inability of almost all commercially available tables, to catch or deduce excess water, a particular problem as standing water leaves visible marks on wood surfaces, which in the long run damages the table and thus the presentation.

== Positioning ==
Bonsai display tables are usually constructed symmetrically. In order to convey the aesthetics of the overall composition and to present their balance, the pot is generally placed in the middle on the Bonsai display table, creating a common symmetry axis through the pot and the table. This is contrary to the general principle in the field of bonsai of avoiding symmetry, but is rather justified by the fact that the table would attract too much attention in case the pot is asymmetrically placed. It is assumed that the correct balance has already been achieved by the correct asymmetric placement of the tree in the pot, which means that the table should have no further role in the determination of the overall balance. The neutral position of the bonsai on the table can be seen as an efficient use of the available space, maximizing the harmony of the overall composition. In the traditional tokonoma, the table is not placed in the middle. In the overall show of the asymmetrical placement of both the tree in the shell and the table in the Tokonoma, anything other than the symmetrical placement of the bonsai on the table would be unharmonious.

On a bonsai display table, besides the bonsai itself, accompanying plants are sometimes shown, which should be in the correct size to suite both the bonsai and the table. In the case of the use of an accompanying plant, the tree is generally placed sideways, in order to be able to present the composition of bonsai and accompanying plant harmoniously on the table.
